

597001–597100 

|-bgcolor=#fefefe
| 597001 ||  || — || August 21, 2006 || Palomar || NEAT ||  || align=right data-sort-value="0.69" | 690 m || 
|-id=002 bgcolor=#E9E9E9
| 597002 ||  || — || August 22, 2006 || Palomar || NEAT ||  || align=right | 1.0 km || 
|-id=003 bgcolor=#fefefe
| 597003 ||  || — || August 22, 2006 || Palomar || NEAT ||  || align=right data-sort-value="0.79" | 790 m || 
|-id=004 bgcolor=#E9E9E9
| 597004 ||  || — || August 24, 2006 || Palomar || NEAT ||  || align=right | 1.8 km || 
|-id=005 bgcolor=#fefefe
| 597005 ||  || — || August 19, 2006 || Kitt Peak || Spacewatch ||  || align=right data-sort-value="0.57" | 570 m || 
|-id=006 bgcolor=#fefefe
| 597006 ||  || — || August 29, 2006 || Wrightwood || J. W. Young ||  || align=right data-sort-value="0.92" | 920 m || 
|-id=007 bgcolor=#fefefe
| 597007 ||  || — || August 21, 2006 || Palomar || NEAT || (2076) || align=right data-sort-value="0.79" | 790 m || 
|-id=008 bgcolor=#fefefe
| 597008 ||  || — || July 21, 2006 || Mount Lemmon || Mount Lemmon Survey ||  || align=right | 1.2 km || 
|-id=009 bgcolor=#fefefe
| 597009 ||  || — || August 27, 2006 || Kitt Peak || Spacewatch ||  || align=right data-sort-value="0.67" | 670 m || 
|-id=010 bgcolor=#d6d6d6
| 597010 ||  || — || June 20, 2006 || Mount Lemmon || Mount Lemmon Survey ||  || align=right | 3.2 km || 
|-id=011 bgcolor=#E9E9E9
| 597011 ||  || — || August 29, 2006 || Catalina || CSS ||  || align=right | 2.0 km || 
|-id=012 bgcolor=#fefefe
| 597012 ||  || — || August 28, 2006 || Catalina || CSS ||  || align=right data-sort-value="0.49" | 490 m || 
|-id=013 bgcolor=#d6d6d6
| 597013 ||  || — || August 17, 2006 || Palomar || NEAT ||  || align=right | 2.2 km || 
|-id=014 bgcolor=#fefefe
| 597014 ||  || — || August 17, 2006 || Palomar || NEAT ||  || align=right data-sort-value="0.82" | 820 m || 
|-id=015 bgcolor=#FA8072
| 597015 ||  || — || July 21, 2006 || Mount Lemmon || Mount Lemmon Survey ||  || align=right data-sort-value="0.64" | 640 m || 
|-id=016 bgcolor=#d6d6d6
| 597016 ||  || — || August 23, 2006 || Palomar || NEAT ||  || align=right | 3.3 km || 
|-id=017 bgcolor=#fefefe
| 597017 ||  || — || August 19, 2006 || Kitt Peak || Spacewatch ||  || align=right data-sort-value="0.48" | 480 m || 
|-id=018 bgcolor=#d6d6d6
| 597018 ||  || — || August 19, 2006 || Kitt Peak || Spacewatch ||  || align=right | 1.8 km || 
|-id=019 bgcolor=#E9E9E9
| 597019 ||  || — || August 19, 2006 || Kitt Peak || Spacewatch ||  || align=right | 2.3 km || 
|-id=020 bgcolor=#E9E9E9
| 597020 ||  || — || August 19, 2006 || Kitt Peak || Spacewatch ||  || align=right | 2.4 km || 
|-id=021 bgcolor=#d6d6d6
| 597021 ||  || — || August 21, 2006 || Kitt Peak || Spacewatch ||  || align=right | 1.8 km || 
|-id=022 bgcolor=#d6d6d6
| 597022 ||  || — || March 28, 2015 || Haleakala || Pan-STARRS ||  || align=right | 3.1 km || 
|-id=023 bgcolor=#d6d6d6
| 597023 ||  || — || February 28, 2014 || Mount Lemmon || Mount Lemmon Survey ||  || align=right | 2.6 km || 
|-id=024 bgcolor=#fefefe
| 597024 ||  || — || December 2, 2010 || Mount Lemmon || Mount Lemmon Survey ||  || align=right data-sort-value="0.72" | 720 m || 
|-id=025 bgcolor=#d6d6d6
| 597025 ||  || — || August 26, 2001 || Palomar || NEAT ||  || align=right | 2.7 km || 
|-id=026 bgcolor=#fefefe
| 597026 ||  || — || January 21, 2015 || Haleakala || Pan-STARRS ||  || align=right data-sort-value="0.67" | 670 m || 
|-id=027 bgcolor=#fefefe
| 597027 ||  || — || August 26, 2013 || Haleakala || Pan-STARRS ||  || align=right data-sort-value="0.63" | 630 m || 
|-id=028 bgcolor=#d6d6d6
| 597028 ||  || — || April 30, 2014 || Haleakala || Pan-STARRS ||  || align=right | 2.1 km || 
|-id=029 bgcolor=#d6d6d6
| 597029 ||  || — || August 28, 2006 || Kitt Peak || Spacewatch ||  || align=right | 2.8 km || 
|-id=030 bgcolor=#fefefe
| 597030 ||  || — || September 18, 2010 || Mount Lemmon || Mount Lemmon Survey ||  || align=right data-sort-value="0.63" | 630 m || 
|-id=031 bgcolor=#fefefe
| 597031 ||  || — || August 27, 2006 || Kitt Peak || Spacewatch ||  || align=right data-sort-value="0.63" | 630 m || 
|-id=032 bgcolor=#fefefe
| 597032 ||  || — || August 18, 2006 || Kitt Peak || Spacewatch ||  || align=right data-sort-value="0.65" | 650 m || 
|-id=033 bgcolor=#fefefe
| 597033 ||  || — || August 19, 2006 || Kitt Peak || Spacewatch ||  || align=right data-sort-value="0.55" | 550 m || 
|-id=034 bgcolor=#fefefe
| 597034 ||  || — || August 29, 2006 || Catalina || CSS ||  || align=right data-sort-value="0.61" | 610 m || 
|-id=035 bgcolor=#d6d6d6
| 597035 ||  || — || August 28, 2006 || Kitt Peak || Spacewatch ||  || align=right | 2.3 km || 
|-id=036 bgcolor=#fefefe
| 597036 ||  || — || August 21, 2006 || Kitt Peak || Spacewatch ||  || align=right data-sort-value="0.71" | 710 m || 
|-id=037 bgcolor=#fefefe
| 597037 ||  || — || August 29, 2006 || Kitt Peak || Spacewatch ||  || align=right data-sort-value="0.71" | 710 m || 
|-id=038 bgcolor=#d6d6d6
| 597038 ||  || — || August 27, 2006 || Kitt Peak || Spacewatch ||  || align=right | 1.9 km || 
|-id=039 bgcolor=#E9E9E9
| 597039 ||  || — || August 27, 2006 || Kitt Peak || Spacewatch ||  || align=right | 1.5 km || 
|-id=040 bgcolor=#fefefe
| 597040 ||  || — || August 28, 2006 || Kitt Peak || Spacewatch ||  || align=right data-sort-value="0.53" | 530 m || 
|-id=041 bgcolor=#d6d6d6
| 597041 ||  || — || September 14, 2006 || Kitt Peak || Spacewatch ||  || align=right | 2.8 km || 
|-id=042 bgcolor=#d6d6d6
| 597042 ||  || — || May 16, 2005 || Mount Lemmon || Mount Lemmon Survey ||  || align=right | 2.5 km || 
|-id=043 bgcolor=#d6d6d6
| 597043 ||  || — || September 14, 2006 || Kitt Peak || Spacewatch ||  || align=right | 2.3 km || 
|-id=044 bgcolor=#fefefe
| 597044 ||  || — || August 29, 2006 || Catalina || CSS ||  || align=right data-sort-value="0.44" | 440 m || 
|-id=045 bgcolor=#d6d6d6
| 597045 ||  || — || September 14, 2006 || Kitt Peak || Spacewatch ||  || align=right | 1.8 km || 
|-id=046 bgcolor=#fefefe
| 597046 ||  || — || September 14, 2006 || Kitt Peak || Spacewatch ||  || align=right data-sort-value="0.53" | 530 m || 
|-id=047 bgcolor=#d6d6d6
| 597047 ||  || — || September 14, 2006 || Kitt Peak || Spacewatch ||  || align=right | 2.1 km || 
|-id=048 bgcolor=#E9E9E9
| 597048 ||  || — || September 14, 2006 || Kitt Peak || Spacewatch ||  || align=right | 2.6 km || 
|-id=049 bgcolor=#fefefe
| 597049 ||  || — || September 14, 2006 || Catalina || CSS ||  || align=right data-sort-value="0.69" | 690 m || 
|-id=050 bgcolor=#fefefe
| 597050 ||  || — || September 15, 2006 || Kitt Peak || Spacewatch ||  || align=right data-sort-value="0.70" | 700 m || 
|-id=051 bgcolor=#d6d6d6
| 597051 ||  || — || September 15, 2006 || Kitt Peak || Spacewatch ||  || align=right | 2.4 km || 
|-id=052 bgcolor=#fefefe
| 597052 ||  || — || September 19, 2006 || Kitt Peak || Spacewatch ||  || align=right data-sort-value="0.59" | 590 m || 
|-id=053 bgcolor=#fefefe
| 597053 ||  || — || September 14, 2006 || Mauna Kea || J. Masiero, R. Jedicke || NYS || align=right data-sort-value="0.62" | 620 m || 
|-id=054 bgcolor=#fefefe
| 597054 ||  || — || March 17, 2001 || Kitt Peak || Spacewatch ||  || align=right data-sort-value="0.66" | 660 m || 
|-id=055 bgcolor=#E9E9E9
| 597055 ||  || — || December 30, 2007 || Mount Lemmon || Mount Lemmon Survey ||  || align=right | 1.8 km || 
|-id=056 bgcolor=#d6d6d6
| 597056 ||  || — || January 1, 2008 || Kitt Peak || Spacewatch ||  || align=right | 1.9 km || 
|-id=057 bgcolor=#d6d6d6
| 597057 ||  || — || September 16, 2006 || Catalina || CSS ||  || align=right | 3.0 km || 
|-id=058 bgcolor=#d6d6d6
| 597058 ||  || — || September 23, 2011 || Haleakala || Pan-STARRS ||  || align=right | 1.8 km || 
|-id=059 bgcolor=#d6d6d6
| 597059 ||  || — || September 14, 2006 || Kitt Peak || Spacewatch ||  || align=right | 2.9 km || 
|-id=060 bgcolor=#fefefe
| 597060 ||  || — || September 15, 2006 || Kitt Peak || Spacewatch ||  || align=right data-sort-value="0.54" | 540 m || 
|-id=061 bgcolor=#fefefe
| 597061 ||  || — || September 15, 2006 || Kitt Peak || Spacewatch ||  || align=right data-sort-value="0.70" | 700 m || 
|-id=062 bgcolor=#d6d6d6
| 597062 ||  || — || July 21, 2006 || Mount Lemmon || Mount Lemmon Survey ||  || align=right | 1.7 km || 
|-id=063 bgcolor=#d6d6d6
| 597063 ||  || — || September 17, 2006 || Kitt Peak || Spacewatch ||  || align=right | 2.0 km || 
|-id=064 bgcolor=#fefefe
| 597064 ||  || — || September 17, 2006 || Catalina || CSS ||  || align=right data-sort-value="0.68" | 680 m || 
|-id=065 bgcolor=#fefefe
| 597065 ||  || — || September 18, 2006 || Catalina || CSS || H || align=right data-sort-value="0.55" | 550 m || 
|-id=066 bgcolor=#E9E9E9
| 597066 ||  || — || March 9, 2005 || Mount Lemmon || Mount Lemmon Survey ||  || align=right | 1.9 km || 
|-id=067 bgcolor=#fefefe
| 597067 ||  || — || September 17, 2006 || Kitt Peak || Spacewatch ||  || align=right data-sort-value="0.58" | 580 m || 
|-id=068 bgcolor=#d6d6d6
| 597068 ||  || — || September 16, 2006 || Catalina || CSS ||  || align=right | 2.5 km || 
|-id=069 bgcolor=#d6d6d6
| 597069 ||  || — || September 19, 2006 || Catalina || CSS ||  || align=right | 2.5 km || 
|-id=070 bgcolor=#fefefe
| 597070 ||  || — || September 18, 2006 || Catalina || CSS ||  || align=right data-sort-value="0.74" | 740 m || 
|-id=071 bgcolor=#d6d6d6
| 597071 ||  || — || September 18, 2006 || Catalina || CSS ||  || align=right | 3.2 km || 
|-id=072 bgcolor=#d6d6d6
| 597072 ||  || — || September 20, 2006 || Bergisch Gladbach || W. Bickel ||  || align=right | 1.9 km || 
|-id=073 bgcolor=#fefefe
| 597073 ||  || — || September 19, 2006 || Kitt Peak || Spacewatch ||  || align=right data-sort-value="0.67" | 670 m || 
|-id=074 bgcolor=#E9E9E9
| 597074 ||  || — || September 19, 2006 || Kitt Peak || Spacewatch ||  || align=right | 2.0 km || 
|-id=075 bgcolor=#E9E9E9
| 597075 ||  || — || March 27, 1995 || Kitt Peak || Spacewatch ||  || align=right | 2.2 km || 
|-id=076 bgcolor=#d6d6d6
| 597076 ||  || — || September 17, 2006 || Kitt Peak || Spacewatch ||  || align=right | 2.4 km || 
|-id=077 bgcolor=#fefefe
| 597077 ||  || — || September 18, 2006 || Kitt Peak || Spacewatch ||  || align=right data-sort-value="0.64" | 640 m || 
|-id=078 bgcolor=#d6d6d6
| 597078 ||  || — || September 18, 2006 || Kitt Peak || Spacewatch ||  || align=right | 1.8 km || 
|-id=079 bgcolor=#E9E9E9
| 597079 ||  || — || September 19, 2006 || Kitt Peak || Spacewatch ||  || align=right | 1.7 km || 
|-id=080 bgcolor=#d6d6d6
| 597080 ||  || — || September 15, 2006 || Kitt Peak || Spacewatch || LIX || align=right | 2.9 km || 
|-id=081 bgcolor=#E9E9E9
| 597081 ||  || — || September 20, 2006 || Catalina || CSS ||  || align=right | 1.8 km || 
|-id=082 bgcolor=#E9E9E9
| 597082 ||  || — || April 4, 2005 || Mount Lemmon || Mount Lemmon Survey ||  || align=right | 1.2 km || 
|-id=083 bgcolor=#d6d6d6
| 597083 ||  || — || September 15, 2006 || Kitt Peak || Spacewatch ||  || align=right | 1.8 km || 
|-id=084 bgcolor=#d6d6d6
| 597084 ||  || — || September 25, 2006 || Kitt Peak || Spacewatch ||  || align=right | 2.0 km || 
|-id=085 bgcolor=#d6d6d6
| 597085 ||  || — || September 26, 2006 || Kitt Peak || Spacewatch ||  || align=right | 2.0 km || 
|-id=086 bgcolor=#d6d6d6
| 597086 ||  || — || September 19, 2006 || Kitt Peak || Spacewatch || THM || align=right | 1.4 km || 
|-id=087 bgcolor=#E9E9E9
| 597087 ||  || — || September 26, 2006 || Mount Lemmon || Mount Lemmon Survey ||  || align=right | 1.4 km || 
|-id=088 bgcolor=#E9E9E9
| 597088 ||  || — || September 24, 2006 || Kitt Peak || Spacewatch ||  || align=right | 2.0 km || 
|-id=089 bgcolor=#d6d6d6
| 597089 ||  || — || September 26, 2006 || Mount Lemmon || Mount Lemmon Survey ||  || align=right | 1.8 km || 
|-id=090 bgcolor=#E9E9E9
| 597090 ||  || — || September 26, 2006 || Catalina || CSS ||  || align=right | 2.2 km || 
|-id=091 bgcolor=#E9E9E9
| 597091 ||  || — || September 17, 2006 || Kitt Peak || Spacewatch ||  || align=right | 1.9 km || 
|-id=092 bgcolor=#d6d6d6
| 597092 ||  || — || September 25, 2006 || Kitt Peak || Spacewatch ||  || align=right | 2.7 km || 
|-id=093 bgcolor=#fefefe
| 597093 ||  || — || September 26, 2006 || Kitt Peak || Spacewatch ||  || align=right data-sort-value="0.85" | 850 m || 
|-id=094 bgcolor=#d6d6d6
| 597094 ||  || — || September 26, 2006 || Kitt Peak || Spacewatch ||  || align=right | 2.0 km || 
|-id=095 bgcolor=#fefefe
| 597095 ||  || — || August 27, 2006 || Kitt Peak || Spacewatch ||  || align=right data-sort-value="0.66" | 660 m || 
|-id=096 bgcolor=#fefefe
| 597096 ||  || — || March 27, 2001 || Kitt Peak || Spacewatch ||  || align=right data-sort-value="0.80" | 800 m || 
|-id=097 bgcolor=#d6d6d6
| 597097 ||  || — || September 26, 2006 || Kitt Peak || Spacewatch ||  || align=right | 2.6 km || 
|-id=098 bgcolor=#fefefe
| 597098 ||  || — || September 17, 2006 || Kitt Peak || Spacewatch ||  || align=right data-sort-value="0.78" | 780 m || 
|-id=099 bgcolor=#fefefe
| 597099 ||  || — || September 28, 2006 || Mount Lemmon || Mount Lemmon Survey ||  || align=right data-sort-value="0.57" | 570 m || 
|-id=100 bgcolor=#d6d6d6
| 597100 ||  || — || September 28, 2006 || Kitt Peak || Spacewatch ||  || align=right | 2.1 km || 
|}

597101–597200 

|-bgcolor=#d6d6d6
| 597101 ||  || — || September 28, 2006 || Kitt Peak || Spacewatch ||  || align=right | 2.0 km || 
|-id=102 bgcolor=#fefefe
| 597102 ||  || — || September 16, 2006 || Catalina || CSS || H || align=right data-sort-value="0.77" | 770 m || 
|-id=103 bgcolor=#d6d6d6
| 597103 ||  || — || September 27, 2006 || Kitt Peak || Spacewatch ||  || align=right | 1.8 km || 
|-id=104 bgcolor=#d6d6d6
| 597104 ||  || — || September 28, 2006 || Kitt Peak || Spacewatch ||  || align=right | 2.5 km || 
|-id=105 bgcolor=#d6d6d6
| 597105 ||  || — || September 28, 2006 || Kitt Peak || Spacewatch ||  || align=right | 1.9 km || 
|-id=106 bgcolor=#d6d6d6
| 597106 ||  || — || September 28, 2006 || Kitt Peak || Spacewatch ||  || align=right | 1.9 km || 
|-id=107 bgcolor=#fefefe
| 597107 ||  || — || September 30, 2006 || Mount Lemmon || Mount Lemmon Survey ||  || align=right data-sort-value="0.58" | 580 m || 
|-id=108 bgcolor=#d6d6d6
| 597108 ||  || — || September 30, 2006 || Mount Lemmon || Mount Lemmon Survey ||  || align=right | 2.1 km || 
|-id=109 bgcolor=#E9E9E9
| 597109 ||  || — || September 30, 2006 || Mount Lemmon || Mount Lemmon Survey ||  || align=right | 1.4 km || 
|-id=110 bgcolor=#d6d6d6
| 597110 ||  || — || September 17, 2006 || Apache Point || SDSS Collaboration ||  || align=right | 2.0 km || 
|-id=111 bgcolor=#d6d6d6
| 597111 ||  || — || September 25, 2006 || Mount Lemmon || Mount Lemmon Survey ||  || align=right | 1.9 km || 
|-id=112 bgcolor=#E9E9E9
| 597112 ||  || — || September 29, 2006 || Apache Point || SDSS Collaboration ||  || align=right | 1.7 km || 
|-id=113 bgcolor=#fefefe
| 597113 ||  || — || September 29, 2006 || Apache Point || SDSS Collaboration ||  || align=right | 1.1 km || 
|-id=114 bgcolor=#d6d6d6
| 597114 ||  || — || September 22, 2006 || Apache Point || SDSS Collaboration ||  || align=right | 2.6 km || 
|-id=115 bgcolor=#E9E9E9
| 597115 ||  || — || September 26, 2006 || Mount Lemmon || Mount Lemmon Survey ||  || align=right | 1.6 km || 
|-id=116 bgcolor=#fefefe
| 597116 ||  || — || December 4, 2007 || Mount Lemmon || Mount Lemmon Survey ||  || align=right data-sort-value="0.61" | 610 m || 
|-id=117 bgcolor=#fefefe
| 597117 ||  || — || September 20, 2006 || Catalina || CSS ||  || align=right data-sort-value="0.74" | 740 m || 
|-id=118 bgcolor=#d6d6d6
| 597118 ||  || — || September 30, 2006 || Mount Lemmon || Mount Lemmon Survey ||  || align=right | 1.9 km || 
|-id=119 bgcolor=#d6d6d6
| 597119 ||  || — || September 27, 2006 || Mount Lemmon || Mount Lemmon Survey ||  || align=right | 1.9 km || 
|-id=120 bgcolor=#d6d6d6
| 597120 ||  || — || February 10, 2008 || Mount Lemmon || Mount Lemmon Survey ||  || align=right | 2.7 km || 
|-id=121 bgcolor=#d6d6d6
| 597121 ||  || — || September 18, 2006 || Kitt Peak || Spacewatch ||  || align=right | 2.0 km || 
|-id=122 bgcolor=#d6d6d6
| 597122 ||  || — || September 26, 2006 || Mount Lemmon || Mount Lemmon Survey ||  || align=right | 2.1 km || 
|-id=123 bgcolor=#fefefe
| 597123 ||  || — || September 27, 2006 || Kitt Peak || Spacewatch ||  || align=right data-sort-value="0.57" | 570 m || 
|-id=124 bgcolor=#d6d6d6
| 597124 ||  || — || September 30, 2006 || Kitt Peak || Spacewatch ||  || align=right | 1.7 km || 
|-id=125 bgcolor=#fefefe
| 597125 ||  || — || March 11, 2016 || Haleakala || Pan-STARRS ||  || align=right data-sort-value="0.62" | 620 m || 
|-id=126 bgcolor=#fefefe
| 597126 ||  || — || June 18, 2013 || Haleakala || Pan-STARRS ||  || align=right data-sort-value="0.50" | 500 m || 
|-id=127 bgcolor=#d6d6d6
| 597127 ||  || — || September 19, 2006 || Kitt Peak || Spacewatch ||  || align=right | 1.9 km || 
|-id=128 bgcolor=#fefefe
| 597128 ||  || — || September 17, 2006 || Kitt Peak || Spacewatch ||  || align=right data-sort-value="0.64" | 640 m || 
|-id=129 bgcolor=#E9E9E9
| 597129 ||  || — || April 5, 2014 || Haleakala || Pan-STARRS ||  || align=right | 1.9 km || 
|-id=130 bgcolor=#d6d6d6
| 597130 ||  || — || March 2, 2009 || Mount Lemmon || Mount Lemmon Survey ||  || align=right | 2.0 km || 
|-id=131 bgcolor=#d6d6d6
| 597131 ||  || — || January 21, 2014 || Mount Lemmon || Mount Lemmon Survey ||  || align=right | 2.1 km || 
|-id=132 bgcolor=#fefefe
| 597132 ||  || — || September 16, 2006 || Kitt Peak || Spacewatch ||  || align=right data-sort-value="0.60" | 600 m || 
|-id=133 bgcolor=#E9E9E9
| 597133 ||  || — || September 18, 2006 || Kitt Peak || Spacewatch ||  || align=right | 1.1 km || 
|-id=134 bgcolor=#fefefe
| 597134 ||  || — || December 14, 2010 || Mount Lemmon || Mount Lemmon Survey ||  || align=right data-sort-value="0.52" | 520 m || 
|-id=135 bgcolor=#E9E9E9
| 597135 ||  || — || September 25, 2006 || Kitt Peak || Spacewatch ||  || align=right | 1.8 km || 
|-id=136 bgcolor=#fefefe
| 597136 ||  || — || March 15, 2012 || Kitt Peak || Spacewatch ||  || align=right data-sort-value="0.63" | 630 m || 
|-id=137 bgcolor=#fefefe
| 597137 ||  || — || September 19, 2006 || Kitt Peak || Spacewatch ||  || align=right data-sort-value="0.50" | 500 m || 
|-id=138 bgcolor=#fefefe
| 597138 ||  || — || September 25, 2006 || Kitt Peak || Spacewatch ||  || align=right data-sort-value="0.51" | 510 m || 
|-id=139 bgcolor=#fefefe
| 597139 ||  || — || September 27, 2006 || Mount Lemmon || Mount Lemmon Survey ||  || align=right data-sort-value="0.51" | 510 m || 
|-id=140 bgcolor=#d6d6d6
| 597140 ||  || — || September 30, 2006 || Kitt Peak || Spacewatch ||  || align=right | 2.4 km || 
|-id=141 bgcolor=#fefefe
| 597141 ||  || — || September 26, 2006 || Kitt Peak || Spacewatch ||  || align=right data-sort-value="0.45" | 450 m || 
|-id=142 bgcolor=#E9E9E9
| 597142 ||  || — || September 17, 2006 || Kitt Peak || Spacewatch ||  || align=right | 1.4 km || 
|-id=143 bgcolor=#E9E9E9
| 597143 ||  || — || September 25, 2006 || Mount Lemmon || Mount Lemmon Survey ||  || align=right | 1.7 km || 
|-id=144 bgcolor=#E9E9E9
| 597144 ||  || — || September 26, 2006 || Kitt Peak || Spacewatch ||  || align=right | 1.6 km || 
|-id=145 bgcolor=#d6d6d6
| 597145 ||  || — || September 18, 2006 || Kitt Peak || Spacewatch ||  || align=right | 2.1 km || 
|-id=146 bgcolor=#d6d6d6
| 597146 ||  || — || October 13, 2006 || Pla D'Arguines || R. Ferrando, M. Ferrando ||  || align=right | 2.5 km || 
|-id=147 bgcolor=#d6d6d6
| 597147 ||  || — || October 3, 2006 || Mount Lemmon || Mount Lemmon Survey ||  || align=right | 1.9 km || 
|-id=148 bgcolor=#E9E9E9
| 597148 Chungmingshan ||  ||  || October 14, 2006 || Lulin || H.-C. Lin, Q.-z. Ye ||  || align=right | 1.3 km || 
|-id=149 bgcolor=#fefefe
| 597149 ||  || — || October 11, 2006 || Palomar || NEAT || MAS || align=right data-sort-value="0.72" | 720 m || 
|-id=150 bgcolor=#d6d6d6
| 597150 ||  || — || September 30, 2006 || Mount Lemmon || Mount Lemmon Survey ||  || align=right | 1.9 km || 
|-id=151 bgcolor=#d6d6d6
| 597151 ||  || — || September 22, 2006 || Apache Point || SDSS Collaboration ||  || align=right | 1.8 km || 
|-id=152 bgcolor=#d6d6d6
| 597152 ||  || — || September 18, 2006 || Apache Point || SDSS Collaboration ||  || align=right | 2.1 km || 
|-id=153 bgcolor=#d6d6d6
| 597153 ||  || — || October 30, 2006 || Mount Lemmon || Mount Lemmon Survey ||  || align=right | 2.2 km || 
|-id=154 bgcolor=#E9E9E9
| 597154 ||  || — || October 2, 2006 || Mount Lemmon || Mount Lemmon Survey ||  || align=right data-sort-value="0.87" | 870 m || 
|-id=155 bgcolor=#fefefe
| 597155 ||  || — || October 2, 2006 || Mount Lemmon || Mount Lemmon Survey ||  || align=right data-sort-value="0.67" | 670 m || 
|-id=156 bgcolor=#fefefe
| 597156 ||  || — || September 25, 2006 || Catalina || CSS ||  || align=right data-sort-value="0.79" | 790 m || 
|-id=157 bgcolor=#d6d6d6
| 597157 ||  || — || November 12, 2012 || Mount Lemmon || Mount Lemmon Survey ||  || align=right | 1.8 km || 
|-id=158 bgcolor=#fefefe
| 597158 ||  || — || October 3, 2006 || Mount Lemmon || Mount Lemmon Survey ||  || align=right data-sort-value="0.77" | 770 m || 
|-id=159 bgcolor=#d6d6d6
| 597159 ||  || — || October 2, 2006 || Mount Lemmon || Mount Lemmon Survey || 7:4 || align=right | 2.3 km || 
|-id=160 bgcolor=#d6d6d6
| 597160 ||  || — || October 13, 2006 || Kitt Peak || Spacewatch ||  || align=right | 2.2 km || 
|-id=161 bgcolor=#d6d6d6
| 597161 ||  || — || October 3, 2006 || Mount Lemmon || Mount Lemmon Survey ||  || align=right | 2.2 km || 
|-id=162 bgcolor=#d6d6d6
| 597162 ||  || — || September 14, 2006 || Kitt Peak || Spacewatch ||  || align=right | 2.4 km || 
|-id=163 bgcolor=#fefefe
| 597163 ||  || — || October 16, 2006 || Mount Lemmon || Mount Lemmon Survey ||  || align=right data-sort-value="0.54" | 540 m || 
|-id=164 bgcolor=#fefefe
| 597164 ||  || — || August 28, 2006 || Kitt Peak || Spacewatch ||  || align=right data-sort-value="0.47" | 470 m || 
|-id=165 bgcolor=#E9E9E9
| 597165 ||  || — || September 26, 2006 || Mount Lemmon || Mount Lemmon Survey ||  || align=right | 1.3 km || 
|-id=166 bgcolor=#d6d6d6
| 597166 ||  || — || October 16, 2006 || Kitt Peak || Spacewatch ||  || align=right | 2.4 km || 
|-id=167 bgcolor=#E9E9E9
| 597167 ||  || — || October 16, 2006 || Kitt Peak || Spacewatch ||  || align=right | 1.9 km || 
|-id=168 bgcolor=#d6d6d6
| 597168 ||  || — || September 26, 2006 || Mount Lemmon || Mount Lemmon Survey ||  || align=right | 2.3 km || 
|-id=169 bgcolor=#fefefe
| 597169 ||  || — || October 16, 2006 || Kitt Peak || Spacewatch ||  || align=right data-sort-value="0.98" | 980 m || 
|-id=170 bgcolor=#d6d6d6
| 597170 ||  || — || July 5, 2000 || Kitt Peak || Spacewatch ||  || align=right | 3.0 km || 
|-id=171 bgcolor=#FFC2E0
| 597171 ||  || — || October 21, 2006 || Mount Lemmon || Mount Lemmon Survey || AMO || align=right data-sort-value="0.59" | 590 m || 
|-id=172 bgcolor=#E9E9E9
| 597172 ||  || — || November 12, 2001 || Apache Point || SDSS Collaboration ||  || align=right | 2.3 km || 
|-id=173 bgcolor=#d6d6d6
| 597173 ||  || — || October 18, 2006 || Kitt Peak || Spacewatch ||  || align=right | 2.5 km || 
|-id=174 bgcolor=#fefefe
| 597174 ||  || — || October 19, 2006 || Kitt Peak || Spacewatch ||  || align=right data-sort-value="0.57" | 570 m || 
|-id=175 bgcolor=#d6d6d6
| 597175 ||  || — || September 30, 2006 || Mount Lemmon || Mount Lemmon Survey ||  || align=right | 2.0 km || 
|-id=176 bgcolor=#fefefe
| 597176 ||  || — || October 2, 2006 || Mount Lemmon || Mount Lemmon Survey ||  || align=right data-sort-value="0.98" | 980 m || 
|-id=177 bgcolor=#d6d6d6
| 597177 ||  || — || October 21, 2006 || Kitt Peak || Spacewatch ||  || align=right | 2.1 km || 
|-id=178 bgcolor=#fefefe
| 597178 ||  || — || October 11, 2006 || Palomar || NEAT ||  || align=right data-sort-value="0.70" | 700 m || 
|-id=179 bgcolor=#d6d6d6
| 597179 ||  || — || October 21, 2006 || Mount Lemmon || Mount Lemmon Survey ||  || align=right | 2.0 km || 
|-id=180 bgcolor=#d6d6d6
| 597180 ||  || — || March 23, 2003 || Apache Point || SDSS Collaboration ||  || align=right | 3.3 km || 
|-id=181 bgcolor=#fefefe
| 597181 ||  || — || October 4, 2006 || Mount Lemmon || Mount Lemmon Survey ||  || align=right data-sort-value="0.61" | 610 m || 
|-id=182 bgcolor=#d6d6d6
| 597182 ||  || — || October 13, 2006 || Kitt Peak || Spacewatch ||  || align=right | 2.5 km || 
|-id=183 bgcolor=#d6d6d6
| 597183 ||  || — || September 26, 2006 || Mount Lemmon || Mount Lemmon Survey ||  || align=right | 2.3 km || 
|-id=184 bgcolor=#d6d6d6
| 597184 ||  || — || October 23, 2006 || Kitt Peak || Spacewatch ||  || align=right | 2.1 km || 
|-id=185 bgcolor=#fefefe
| 597185 ||  || — || October 14, 1999 || Kitt Peak || Spacewatch ||  || align=right data-sort-value="0.70" | 700 m || 
|-id=186 bgcolor=#E9E9E9
| 597186 ||  || — || September 27, 2006 || Kitt Peak || Spacewatch ||  || align=right | 1.9 km || 
|-id=187 bgcolor=#FA8072
| 597187 ||  || — || October 16, 2006 || Catalina || CSS ||  || align=right data-sort-value="0.58" | 580 m || 
|-id=188 bgcolor=#fefefe
| 597188 ||  || — || October 23, 2006 || Kitt Peak || Spacewatch ||  || align=right data-sort-value="0.66" | 660 m || 
|-id=189 bgcolor=#d6d6d6
| 597189 ||  || — || October 12, 2006 || Kitt Peak || Spacewatch ||  || align=right | 1.9 km || 
|-id=190 bgcolor=#E9E9E9
| 597190 ||  || — || October 19, 2006 || Kitt Peak || L. H. Wasserman ||  || align=right | 2.3 km || 
|-id=191 bgcolor=#E9E9E9
| 597191 ||  || — || September 28, 2006 || Mount Lemmon || Mount Lemmon Survey ||  || align=right | 1.8 km || 
|-id=192 bgcolor=#fefefe
| 597192 ||  || — || April 6, 2005 || Mount Lemmon || Mount Lemmon Survey ||  || align=right data-sort-value="0.75" | 750 m || 
|-id=193 bgcolor=#fefefe
| 597193 ||  || — || March 10, 2005 || Mount Lemmon || Mount Lemmon Survey ||  || align=right data-sort-value="0.87" | 870 m || 
|-id=194 bgcolor=#fefefe
| 597194 ||  || — || October 19, 2006 || Kitt Peak || L. H. Wasserman ||  || align=right data-sort-value="0.67" | 670 m || 
|-id=195 bgcolor=#fefefe
| 597195 ||  || — || October 31, 2006 || Mount Lemmon || Mount Lemmon Survey ||  || align=right data-sort-value="0.75" | 750 m || 
|-id=196 bgcolor=#d6d6d6
| 597196 ||  || — || October 11, 2006 || Apache Point || SDSS Collaboration ||  || align=right | 1.9 km || 
|-id=197 bgcolor=#fefefe
| 597197 ||  || — || April 13, 2008 || Mount Lemmon || Mount Lemmon Survey ||  || align=right data-sort-value="0.62" | 620 m || 
|-id=198 bgcolor=#fefefe
| 597198 ||  || — || April 25, 2008 || Mount Lemmon || Mount Lemmon Survey ||  || align=right data-sort-value="0.53" | 530 m || 
|-id=199 bgcolor=#fefefe
| 597199 ||  || — || February 26, 2008 || Kitt Peak || Spacewatch ||  || align=right data-sort-value="0.63" | 630 m || 
|-id=200 bgcolor=#d6d6d6
| 597200 ||  || — || November 12, 2006 || Mount Lemmon || Mount Lemmon Survey ||  || align=right | 2.0 km || 
|}

597201–597300 

|-bgcolor=#d6d6d6
| 597201 ||  || — || October 28, 2006 || Mount Lemmon || Mount Lemmon Survey ||  || align=right | 1.9 km || 
|-id=202 bgcolor=#d6d6d6
| 597202 ||  || — || October 20, 2011 || Kitt Peak || Spacewatch ||  || align=right | 2.1 km || 
|-id=203 bgcolor=#fefefe
| 597203 ||  || — || October 16, 2006 || Kitt Peak || Spacewatch ||  || align=right data-sort-value="0.64" | 640 m || 
|-id=204 bgcolor=#E9E9E9
| 597204 ||  || — || October 22, 2006 || Catalina || CSS ||  || align=right | 2.4 km || 
|-id=205 bgcolor=#d6d6d6
| 597205 ||  || — || September 8, 2011 || Kitt Peak || Spacewatch ||  || align=right | 2.1 km || 
|-id=206 bgcolor=#d6d6d6
| 597206 ||  || — || September 25, 2006 || Mount Lemmon || Mount Lemmon Survey ||  || align=right | 2.0 km || 
|-id=207 bgcolor=#d6d6d6
| 597207 ||  || — || October 23, 2006 || Mount Lemmon || Mount Lemmon Survey ||  || align=right | 2.5 km || 
|-id=208 bgcolor=#d6d6d6
| 597208 ||  || — || December 5, 2007 || Kitt Peak || Spacewatch ||  || align=right | 2.4 km || 
|-id=209 bgcolor=#d6d6d6
| 597209 ||  || — || October 18, 2006 || Kitt Peak || Spacewatch ||  || align=right | 1.8 km || 
|-id=210 bgcolor=#fefefe
| 597210 ||  || — || October 22, 2006 || Palomar || NEAT ||  || align=right data-sort-value="0.62" | 620 m || 
|-id=211 bgcolor=#E9E9E9
| 597211 ||  || — || October 21, 2006 || Mount Lemmon || Mount Lemmon Survey ||  || align=right | 1.9 km || 
|-id=212 bgcolor=#E9E9E9
| 597212 ||  || — || October 27, 2006 || Catalina || CSS ||  || align=right data-sort-value="0.80" | 800 m || 
|-id=213 bgcolor=#d6d6d6
| 597213 ||  || — || October 31, 2006 || Mount Lemmon || Mount Lemmon Survey ||  || align=right | 1.9 km || 
|-id=214 bgcolor=#fefefe
| 597214 ||  || — || October 21, 2006 || Mount Lemmon || Mount Lemmon Survey ||  || align=right data-sort-value="0.54" | 540 m || 
|-id=215 bgcolor=#d6d6d6
| 597215 ||  || — || October 16, 2006 || Kitt Peak || Spacewatch ||  || align=right | 1.6 km || 
|-id=216 bgcolor=#fefefe
| 597216 ||  || — || October 27, 2006 || Catalina || CSS || H || align=right data-sort-value="0.54" | 540 m || 
|-id=217 bgcolor=#E9E9E9
| 597217 ||  || — || October 21, 2006 || Kitt Peak || Spacewatch ||  || align=right | 1.4 km || 
|-id=218 bgcolor=#fefefe
| 597218 ||  || — || October 20, 2006 || Mount Lemmon || Mount Lemmon Survey ||  || align=right data-sort-value="0.53" | 530 m || 
|-id=219 bgcolor=#fefefe
| 597219 ||  || — || October 21, 2006 || Mount Lemmon || Mount Lemmon Survey || V || align=right data-sort-value="0.72" | 720 m || 
|-id=220 bgcolor=#E9E9E9
| 597220 ||  || — || November 12, 2006 || Mount Lemmon || Mount Lemmon Survey ||  || align=right | 1.6 km || 
|-id=221 bgcolor=#d6d6d6
| 597221 ||  || — || October 19, 2006 || Mount Lemmon || Mount Lemmon Survey ||  || align=right | 1.7 km || 
|-id=222 bgcolor=#fefefe
| 597222 ||  || — || October 18, 2006 || Kitt Peak || Spacewatch || H || align=right data-sort-value="0.50" | 500 m || 
|-id=223 bgcolor=#fefefe
| 597223 ||  || — || October 22, 2006 || Palomar || NEAT || (5026) || align=right | 1.1 km || 
|-id=224 bgcolor=#d6d6d6
| 597224 ||  || — || November 15, 2006 || Mount Lemmon || Mount Lemmon Survey ||  || align=right | 2.0 km || 
|-id=225 bgcolor=#d6d6d6
| 597225 ||  || — || October 21, 2006 || Mount Lemmon || Mount Lemmon Survey ||  || align=right | 2.1 km || 
|-id=226 bgcolor=#E9E9E9
| 597226 ||  || — || November 12, 2006 || Lulin || LUSS ||  || align=right data-sort-value="0.72" | 720 m || 
|-id=227 bgcolor=#d6d6d6
| 597227 ||  || — || October 23, 2006 || Kitt Peak || Spacewatch || EOS || align=right | 1.8 km || 
|-id=228 bgcolor=#fefefe
| 597228 ||  || — || October 16, 2006 || Catalina || CSS ||  || align=right data-sort-value="0.98" | 980 m || 
|-id=229 bgcolor=#fefefe
| 597229 ||  || — || October 20, 2006 || Mount Lemmon || Mount Lemmon Survey ||  || align=right data-sort-value="0.62" | 620 m || 
|-id=230 bgcolor=#fefefe
| 597230 ||  || — || November 4, 2002 || Kitt Peak || Spacewatch ||  || align=right data-sort-value="0.91" | 910 m || 
|-id=231 bgcolor=#d6d6d6
| 597231 ||  || — || October 31, 2006 || Mount Lemmon || Mount Lemmon Survey || Tj (2.99) || align=right | 3.4 km || 
|-id=232 bgcolor=#fefefe
| 597232 ||  || — || May 19, 2005 || Mount Lemmon || Mount Lemmon Survey ||  || align=right data-sort-value="0.61" | 610 m || 
|-id=233 bgcolor=#d6d6d6
| 597233 ||  || — || November 15, 2006 || Kitt Peak || Spacewatch ||  || align=right | 1.8 km || 
|-id=234 bgcolor=#d6d6d6
| 597234 ||  || — || November 10, 2006 || Kitt Peak || Spacewatch ||  || align=right | 1.7 km || 
|-id=235 bgcolor=#fefefe
| 597235 ||  || — || November 15, 2006 || Kitt Peak || Spacewatch ||  || align=right data-sort-value="0.59" | 590 m || 
|-id=236 bgcolor=#d6d6d6
| 597236 ||  || — || October 19, 2011 || Kitt Peak || Spacewatch ||  || align=right | 2.2 km || 
|-id=237 bgcolor=#d6d6d6
| 597237 ||  || — || November 11, 2006 || Kitt Peak || Spacewatch ||  || align=right | 2.6 km || 
|-id=238 bgcolor=#fefefe
| 597238 ||  || — || November 11, 2006 || Mount Lemmon || Mount Lemmon Survey ||  || align=right data-sort-value="0.77" | 770 m || 
|-id=239 bgcolor=#fefefe
| 597239 ||  || — || November 17, 2006 || Mount Lemmon || Mount Lemmon Survey ||  || align=right data-sort-value="0.65" | 650 m || 
|-id=240 bgcolor=#E9E9E9
| 597240 ||  || — || November 21, 2006 || Mauna Kea || Mauna Kea Obs. ||  || align=right | 1.4 km || 
|-id=241 bgcolor=#E9E9E9
| 597241 ||  || — || November 16, 2006 || Mount Lemmon || Mount Lemmon Survey ||  || align=right | 1.4 km || 
|-id=242 bgcolor=#fefefe
| 597242 ||  || — || June 10, 2005 || Kitt Peak || Spacewatch ||  || align=right data-sort-value="0.88" | 880 m || 
|-id=243 bgcolor=#E9E9E9
| 597243 ||  || — || November 16, 2006 || Kitt Peak || Spacewatch ||  || align=right | 1.4 km || 
|-id=244 bgcolor=#d6d6d6
| 597244 ||  || — || October 3, 2006 || Mount Lemmon || Mount Lemmon Survey ||  || align=right | 2.4 km || 
|-id=245 bgcolor=#fefefe
| 597245 ||  || — || March 23, 2004 || Kitt Peak || Spacewatch ||  || align=right data-sort-value="0.92" | 920 m || 
|-id=246 bgcolor=#d6d6d6
| 597246 ||  || — || November 17, 2006 || Mount Lemmon || Mount Lemmon Survey ||  || align=right | 3.0 km || 
|-id=247 bgcolor=#E9E9E9
| 597247 ||  || — || November 18, 2006 || Kitt Peak || Spacewatch ||  || align=right data-sort-value="0.58" | 580 m || 
|-id=248 bgcolor=#d6d6d6
| 597248 ||  || — || November 18, 2006 || Kitt Peak || Spacewatch ||  || align=right | 1.9 km || 
|-id=249 bgcolor=#E9E9E9
| 597249 ||  || — || November 18, 2006 || Mount Lemmon || Mount Lemmon Survey ||  || align=right | 1.4 km || 
|-id=250 bgcolor=#d6d6d6
| 597250 ||  || — || November 20, 2006 || Mount Lemmon || Mount Lemmon Survey ||  || align=right | 2.1 km || 
|-id=251 bgcolor=#fefefe
| 597251 ||  || — || November 22, 2006 || Mount Lemmon || Mount Lemmon Survey ||  || align=right data-sort-value="0.69" | 690 m || 
|-id=252 bgcolor=#fefefe
| 597252 ||  || — || October 12, 2006 || Palomar || NEAT ||  || align=right data-sort-value="0.71" | 710 m || 
|-id=253 bgcolor=#d6d6d6
| 597253 ||  || — || November 20, 2006 || Kitt Peak || Spacewatch ||  || align=right | 2.4 km || 
|-id=254 bgcolor=#fefefe
| 597254 ||  || — || November 20, 2006 || Mount Lemmon || Mount Lemmon Survey ||  || align=right data-sort-value="0.71" | 710 m || 
|-id=255 bgcolor=#E9E9E9
| 597255 ||  || — || November 20, 2006 || Kitt Peak || Spacewatch ||  || align=right data-sort-value="0.69" | 690 m || 
|-id=256 bgcolor=#d6d6d6
| 597256 ||  || — || November 22, 2006 || Kitt Peak || Spacewatch ||  || align=right | 2.0 km || 
|-id=257 bgcolor=#fefefe
| 597257 ||  || — || November 15, 2006 || Kitt Peak || Spacewatch ||  || align=right data-sort-value="0.51" | 510 m || 
|-id=258 bgcolor=#fefefe
| 597258 ||  || — || November 11, 2006 || Kitt Peak || Spacewatch ||  || align=right data-sort-value="0.86" | 860 m || 
|-id=259 bgcolor=#fefefe
| 597259 ||  || — || October 28, 2006 || Mount Lemmon || Mount Lemmon Survey ||  || align=right data-sort-value="0.61" | 610 m || 
|-id=260 bgcolor=#d6d6d6
| 597260 ||  || — || November 25, 2006 || Mount Lemmon || Mount Lemmon Survey ||  || align=right | 2.2 km || 
|-id=261 bgcolor=#E9E9E9
| 597261 ||  || — || November 20, 2006 || Catalina || CSS ||  || align=right | 1.1 km || 
|-id=262 bgcolor=#E9E9E9
| 597262 ||  || — || November 23, 2006 || Mount Lemmon || Mount Lemmon Survey ||  || align=right data-sort-value="0.91" | 910 m || 
|-id=263 bgcolor=#E9E9E9
| 597263 ||  || — || October 13, 2010 || Mount Lemmon || Mount Lemmon Survey ||  || align=right data-sort-value="0.78" | 780 m || 
|-id=264 bgcolor=#fefefe
| 597264 ||  || — || November 17, 2006 || Kitt Peak || Spacewatch ||  || align=right data-sort-value="0.72" | 720 m || 
|-id=265 bgcolor=#E9E9E9
| 597265 ||  || — || February 11, 2008 || Mount Lemmon || Mount Lemmon Survey ||  || align=right | 2.0 km || 
|-id=266 bgcolor=#d6d6d6
| 597266 ||  || — || February 3, 2008 || Mount Lemmon || Mount Lemmon Survey ||  || align=right | 2.4 km || 
|-id=267 bgcolor=#d6d6d6
| 597267 ||  || — || November 21, 2006 || Mount Lemmon || Mount Lemmon Survey ||  || align=right | 2.7 km || 
|-id=268 bgcolor=#fefefe
| 597268 ||  || — || April 27, 2012 || Haleakala || Pan-STARRS ||  || align=right data-sort-value="0.76" | 760 m || 
|-id=269 bgcolor=#fefefe
| 597269 ||  || — || October 9, 2013 || Mount Lemmon || Mount Lemmon Survey ||  || align=right data-sort-value="0.63" | 630 m || 
|-id=270 bgcolor=#fefefe
| 597270 ||  || — || February 11, 2008 || Mount Lemmon || Mount Lemmon Survey ||  || align=right data-sort-value="0.74" | 740 m || 
|-id=271 bgcolor=#fefefe
| 597271 ||  || — || March 28, 2008 || Mount Lemmon || Mount Lemmon Survey ||  || align=right data-sort-value="0.66" | 660 m || 
|-id=272 bgcolor=#d6d6d6
| 597272 ||  || — || February 2, 2008 || Kitt Peak || Spacewatch ||  || align=right | 2.1 km || 
|-id=273 bgcolor=#fefefe
| 597273 ||  || — || January 12, 2011 || Mount Lemmon || Mount Lemmon Survey ||  || align=right data-sort-value="0.61" | 610 m || 
|-id=274 bgcolor=#E9E9E9
| 597274 ||  || — || July 3, 2015 || Haleakala || Pan-STARRS ||  || align=right | 2.6 km || 
|-id=275 bgcolor=#fefefe
| 597275 ||  || — || November 16, 2006 || Mount Lemmon || Mount Lemmon Survey || H || align=right data-sort-value="0.56" | 560 m || 
|-id=276 bgcolor=#fefefe
| 597276 ||  || — || November 17, 2006 || Mount Lemmon || Mount Lemmon Survey ||  || align=right data-sort-value="0.95" | 950 m || 
|-id=277 bgcolor=#d6d6d6
| 597277 ||  || — || February 24, 2014 || Haleakala || Pan-STARRS ||  || align=right | 2.6 km || 
|-id=278 bgcolor=#d6d6d6
| 597278 ||  || — || December 23, 2011 || Sandlot || G. Hug ||  || align=right | 3.7 km || 
|-id=279 bgcolor=#fefefe
| 597279 ||  || — || November 23, 2006 || Kitt Peak || Spacewatch ||  || align=right data-sort-value="0.54" | 540 m || 
|-id=280 bgcolor=#d6d6d6
| 597280 ||  || — || November 19, 2006 || Kitt Peak || Spacewatch ||  || align=right | 1.9 km || 
|-id=281 bgcolor=#d6d6d6
| 597281 ||  || — || December 12, 2006 || Socorro || LINEAR || Tj (2.92) || align=right | 3.6 km || 
|-id=282 bgcolor=#fefefe
| 597282 ||  || — || November 18, 2006 || Kitt Peak || Spacewatch ||  || align=right data-sort-value="0.69" | 690 m || 
|-id=283 bgcolor=#d6d6d6
| 597283 ||  || — || December 12, 2006 || Kitt Peak || Spacewatch ||  || align=right | 1.9 km || 
|-id=284 bgcolor=#fefefe
| 597284 ||  || — || December 13, 2006 || Kitt Peak || Spacewatch ||  || align=right data-sort-value="0.62" | 620 m || 
|-id=285 bgcolor=#E9E9E9
| 597285 ||  || — || December 15, 2006 || Socorro || LINEAR ||  || align=right | 2.2 km || 
|-id=286 bgcolor=#fefefe
| 597286 ||  || — || November 16, 2006 || Kitt Peak || Spacewatch ||  || align=right data-sort-value="0.83" | 830 m || 
|-id=287 bgcolor=#d6d6d6
| 597287 ||  || — || December 13, 2006 || Mount Lemmon || Mount Lemmon Survey ||  || align=right | 2.5 km || 
|-id=288 bgcolor=#d6d6d6
| 597288 ||  || — || May 20, 2005 || Mount Lemmon || Mount Lemmon Survey ||  || align=right | 3.2 km || 
|-id=289 bgcolor=#fefefe
| 597289 ||  || — || December 12, 2006 || Kitt Peak || Spacewatch ||  || align=right data-sort-value="0.63" | 630 m || 
|-id=290 bgcolor=#d6d6d6
| 597290 ||  || — || December 15, 2006 || Mount Lemmon || Mount Lemmon Survey ||  || align=right | 3.1 km || 
|-id=291 bgcolor=#d6d6d6
| 597291 ||  || — || December 11, 2006 || Kitt Peak || Spacewatch ||  || align=right | 2.5 km || 
|-id=292 bgcolor=#d6d6d6
| 597292 ||  || — || December 13, 2006 || Mount Lemmon || Mount Lemmon Survey ||  || align=right | 2.0 km || 
|-id=293 bgcolor=#d6d6d6
| 597293 ||  || — || January 23, 2018 || Mount Lemmon || Mount Lemmon Survey ||  || align=right | 1.9 km || 
|-id=294 bgcolor=#fefefe
| 597294 ||  || — || December 21, 2006 || Kitt Peak || Spacewatch ||  || align=right data-sort-value="0.85" | 850 m || 
|-id=295 bgcolor=#d6d6d6
| 597295 ||  || — || December 22, 2006 || Kitt Peak || Spacewatch ||  || align=right | 3.9 km || 
|-id=296 bgcolor=#d6d6d6
| 597296 ||  || — || December 21, 2006 || Mount Lemmon || Mount Lemmon Survey ||  || align=right | 2.6 km || 
|-id=297 bgcolor=#d6d6d6
| 597297 ||  || — || December 24, 2006 || Mount Lemmon || Mount Lemmon Survey || Tj (2.97) || align=right | 3.5 km || 
|-id=298 bgcolor=#d6d6d6
| 597298 ||  || — || December 16, 2006 || Kitt Peak || Spacewatch ||  || align=right | 2.2 km || 
|-id=299 bgcolor=#fefefe
| 597299 ||  || — || December 24, 2006 || Kitt Peak || Spacewatch ||  || align=right data-sort-value="0.57" | 570 m || 
|-id=300 bgcolor=#d6d6d6
| 597300 ||  || — || December 27, 2006 || Mount Lemmon || Mount Lemmon Survey ||  || align=right | 2.4 km || 
|}

597301–597400 

|-bgcolor=#fefefe
| 597301 ||  || — || December 21, 2006 || Kitt Peak || L. H. Wasserman ||  || align=right data-sort-value="0.46" | 460 m || 
|-id=302 bgcolor=#d6d6d6
| 597302 ||  || — || December 26, 2006 || Kitt Peak || Spacewatch ||  || align=right | 2.1 km || 
|-id=303 bgcolor=#d6d6d6
| 597303 ||  || — || December 24, 2017 || Haleakala || Pan-STARRS ||  || align=right | 2.0 km || 
|-id=304 bgcolor=#d6d6d6
| 597304 ||  || — || December 27, 2006 || Mount Lemmon || Mount Lemmon Survey ||  || align=right | 2.1 km || 
|-id=305 bgcolor=#d6d6d6
| 597305 ||  || — || April 1, 2003 || Apache Point || SDSS Collaboration ||  || align=right | 2.9 km || 
|-id=306 bgcolor=#fefefe
| 597306 ||  || — || January 15, 2007 || Mauna Kea || Mauna Kea Obs. ||  || align=right data-sort-value="0.58" | 580 m || 
|-id=307 bgcolor=#d6d6d6
| 597307 ||  || — || January 10, 2007 || Kitt Peak || Spacewatch ||  || align=right | 2.4 km || 
|-id=308 bgcolor=#E9E9E9
| 597308 ||  || — || January 16, 2007 || Catalina || CSS ||  || align=right | 1.5 km || 
|-id=309 bgcolor=#fefefe
| 597309 ||  || — || December 21, 2006 || Catalina || CSS ||  || align=right | 1.2 km || 
|-id=310 bgcolor=#fefefe
| 597310 ||  || — || January 17, 2007 || Kitt Peak || Spacewatch ||  || align=right data-sort-value="0.50" | 500 m || 
|-id=311 bgcolor=#E9E9E9
| 597311 ||  || — || January 9, 2007 || Mount Lemmon || Mount Lemmon Survey ||  || align=right | 1.8 km || 
|-id=312 bgcolor=#E9E9E9
| 597312 ||  || — || January 24, 2007 || Mount Lemmon || Mount Lemmon Survey ||  || align=right | 2.3 km || 
|-id=313 bgcolor=#d6d6d6
| 597313 ||  || — || January 24, 2007 || Mount Lemmon || Mount Lemmon Survey ||  || align=right | 2.3 km || 
|-id=314 bgcolor=#d6d6d6
| 597314 ||  || — || January 24, 2007 || Kitt Peak || Spacewatch ||  || align=right | 2.4 km || 
|-id=315 bgcolor=#d6d6d6
| 597315 ||  || — || January 24, 2007 || Socorro || LINEAR ||  || align=right | 2.8 km || 
|-id=316 bgcolor=#d6d6d6
| 597316 ||  || — || December 27, 2006 || Mount Lemmon || Mount Lemmon Survey ||  || align=right | 2.7 km || 
|-id=317 bgcolor=#fefefe
| 597317 ||  || — || April 28, 2008 || Kitt Peak || Spacewatch ||  || align=right data-sort-value="0.74" | 740 m || 
|-id=318 bgcolor=#d6d6d6
| 597318 ||  || — || January 19, 2007 || Mauna Kea || Mauna Kea Obs. ||  || align=right | 2.6 km || 
|-id=319 bgcolor=#E9E9E9
| 597319 ||  || — || September 2, 2005 || Saint-Sulpice || B. Christophe ||  || align=right data-sort-value="0.87" | 870 m || 
|-id=320 bgcolor=#d6d6d6
| 597320 ||  || — || January 28, 2007 || Mount Lemmon || Mount Lemmon Survey ||  || align=right | 2.5 km || 
|-id=321 bgcolor=#E9E9E9
| 597321 ||  || — || January 25, 2007 || Kitt Peak || Spacewatch ||  || align=right | 1.2 km || 
|-id=322 bgcolor=#d6d6d6
| 597322 ||  || — || June 27, 2014 || Haleakala || Pan-STARRS ||  || align=right | 2.1 km || 
|-id=323 bgcolor=#d6d6d6
| 597323 ||  || — || January 27, 2007 || Kitt Peak || Spacewatch ||  || align=right | 2.2 km || 
|-id=324 bgcolor=#d6d6d6
| 597324 ||  || — || October 12, 2015 || Haleakala || Pan-STARRS ||  || align=right | 2.3 km || 
|-id=325 bgcolor=#d6d6d6
| 597325 ||  || — || January 28, 2007 || Kitt Peak || Spacewatch ||  || align=right | 2.7 km || 
|-id=326 bgcolor=#d6d6d6
| 597326 ||  || — || March 19, 2013 || Haleakala || Pan-STARRS ||  || align=right | 1.9 km || 
|-id=327 bgcolor=#fefefe
| 597327 ||  || — || January 17, 2007 || Kitt Peak || Spacewatch ||  || align=right data-sort-value="0.57" | 570 m || 
|-id=328 bgcolor=#d6d6d6
| 597328 ||  || — || August 21, 2015 || Haleakala || Pan-STARRS ||  || align=right | 2.6 km || 
|-id=329 bgcolor=#d6d6d6
| 597329 ||  || — || December 27, 2006 || Mount Lemmon || Mount Lemmon Survey ||  || align=right | 2.3 km || 
|-id=330 bgcolor=#fefefe
| 597330 ||  || — || January 27, 2007 || Mount Lemmon || Mount Lemmon Survey ||  || align=right data-sort-value="0.56" | 560 m || 
|-id=331 bgcolor=#fefefe
| 597331 ||  || — || January 17, 2007 || Kitt Peak || Spacewatch ||  || align=right data-sort-value="0.74" | 740 m || 
|-id=332 bgcolor=#d6d6d6
| 597332 ||  || — || February 6, 2007 || Mount Lemmon || Mount Lemmon Survey ||  || align=right | 2.2 km || 
|-id=333 bgcolor=#d6d6d6
| 597333 ||  || — || July 16, 2004 || Cerro Tololo || Cerro Tololo Obs. ||  || align=right | 2.3 km || 
|-id=334 bgcolor=#d6d6d6
| 597334 ||  || — || January 17, 2007 || Catalina || CSS ||  || align=right | 2.7 km || 
|-id=335 bgcolor=#fefefe
| 597335 ||  || — || January 27, 2007 || Mount Lemmon || Mount Lemmon Survey ||  || align=right data-sort-value="0.43" | 430 m || 
|-id=336 bgcolor=#d6d6d6
| 597336 ||  || — || February 6, 2007 || Mount Lemmon || Mount Lemmon Survey ||  || align=right | 2.3 km || 
|-id=337 bgcolor=#d6d6d6
| 597337 ||  || — || February 6, 2007 || Mount Lemmon || Mount Lemmon Survey ||  || align=right | 2.5 km || 
|-id=338 bgcolor=#d6d6d6
| 597338 ||  || — || February 7, 2007 || Kitt Peak || Spacewatch ||  || align=right | 2.5 km || 
|-id=339 bgcolor=#d6d6d6
| 597339 ||  || — || January 27, 2007 || Kitt Peak || Spacewatch ||  || align=right | 1.8 km || 
|-id=340 bgcolor=#d6d6d6
| 597340 ||  || — || February 13, 2007 || Mount Lemmon || Mount Lemmon Survey ||  || align=right | 2.3 km || 
|-id=341 bgcolor=#d6d6d6
| 597341 ||  || — || February 14, 2007 || Mauna Kea || Mauna Kea Obs. ||  || align=right | 2.0 km || 
|-id=342 bgcolor=#fefefe
| 597342 ||  || — || July 24, 2001 || Palomar || NEAT ||  || align=right data-sort-value="0.89" | 890 m || 
|-id=343 bgcolor=#d6d6d6
| 597343 ||  || — || January 3, 2017 || Haleakala || Pan-STARRS || Tj (2.97) || align=right | 3.8 km || 
|-id=344 bgcolor=#d6d6d6
| 597344 ||  || — || February 6, 2007 || Mount Lemmon || Mount Lemmon Survey ||  || align=right | 2.1 km || 
|-id=345 bgcolor=#d6d6d6
| 597345 ||  || — || March 8, 2013 || Haleakala || Pan-STARRS ||  || align=right | 2.2 km || 
|-id=346 bgcolor=#fefefe
| 597346 ||  || — || February 6, 2007 || Kitt Peak || Spacewatch ||  || align=right data-sort-value="0.65" | 650 m || 
|-id=347 bgcolor=#fefefe
| 597347 ||  || — || February 10, 2007 || Mount Lemmon || Mount Lemmon Survey ||  || align=right data-sort-value="0.45" | 450 m || 
|-id=348 bgcolor=#d6d6d6
| 597348 ||  || — || February 16, 2007 || Mount Lemmon || Mount Lemmon Survey ||  || align=right | 2.4 km || 
|-id=349 bgcolor=#fefefe
| 597349 ||  || — || January 13, 2003 || Socorro || LINEAR ||  || align=right | 1.0 km || 
|-id=350 bgcolor=#E9E9E9
| 597350 ||  || — || February 16, 2007 || Catalina || CSS ||  || align=right | 1.2 km || 
|-id=351 bgcolor=#d6d6d6
| 597351 ||  || — || February 17, 2007 || Kitt Peak || Spacewatch ||  || align=right | 2.6 km || 
|-id=352 bgcolor=#d6d6d6
| 597352 ||  || — || February 17, 2007 || Catalina || CSS ||  || align=right | 2.2 km || 
|-id=353 bgcolor=#d6d6d6
| 597353 ||  || — || February 17, 2007 || Mount Lemmon || Mount Lemmon Survey ||  || align=right | 3.3 km || 
|-id=354 bgcolor=#E9E9E9
| 597354 ||  || — || February 10, 2007 || Mount Lemmon || Mount Lemmon Survey ||  || align=right data-sort-value="0.93" | 930 m || 
|-id=355 bgcolor=#E9E9E9
| 597355 ||  || — || September 23, 2005 || Kitt Peak || Spacewatch ||  || align=right | 1.3 km || 
|-id=356 bgcolor=#E9E9E9
| 597356 ||  || — || January 27, 2007 || Mount Lemmon || Mount Lemmon Survey ||  || align=right | 1.1 km || 
|-id=357 bgcolor=#E9E9E9
| 597357 ||  || — || February 21, 2007 || Kitt Peak || Spacewatch ||  || align=right | 1.4 km || 
|-id=358 bgcolor=#d6d6d6
| 597358 ||  || — || February 21, 2007 || Kitt Peak || Spacewatch ||  || align=right | 2.6 km || 
|-id=359 bgcolor=#d6d6d6
| 597359 ||  || — || February 21, 2007 || Kitt Peak || Spacewatch ||  || align=right | 2.6 km || 
|-id=360 bgcolor=#fefefe
| 597360 ||  || — || February 23, 2007 || Mount Lemmon || Mount Lemmon Survey ||  || align=right data-sort-value="0.76" | 760 m || 
|-id=361 bgcolor=#d6d6d6
| 597361 ||  || — || February 23, 2007 || Kitt Peak || Spacewatch ||  || align=right | 2.8 km || 
|-id=362 bgcolor=#fefefe
| 597362 ||  || — || April 5, 2003 || Kitt Peak || Spacewatch ||  || align=right data-sort-value="0.65" | 650 m || 
|-id=363 bgcolor=#d6d6d6
| 597363 ||  || — || January 27, 2007 || Mount Lemmon || Mount Lemmon Survey ||  || align=right | 2.7 km || 
|-id=364 bgcolor=#E9E9E9
| 597364 ||  || — || February 9, 2003 || Kitt Peak || Spacewatch ||  || align=right data-sort-value="0.87" | 870 m || 
|-id=365 bgcolor=#d6d6d6
| 597365 ||  || — || February 25, 2007 || Kitt Peak || Spacewatch ||  || align=right | 2.4 km || 
|-id=366 bgcolor=#d6d6d6
| 597366 ||  || — || January 27, 2007 || Kitt Peak || Spacewatch ||  || align=right | 2.1 km || 
|-id=367 bgcolor=#d6d6d6
| 597367 ||  || — || February 21, 2007 || Mount Lemmon || Mount Lemmon Survey ||  || align=right | 3.5 km || 
|-id=368 bgcolor=#d6d6d6
| 597368 ||  || — || February 26, 2007 || Mount Lemmon || Mount Lemmon Survey ||  || align=right | 3.0 km || 
|-id=369 bgcolor=#d6d6d6
| 597369 ||  || — || February 26, 2007 || Mount Lemmon || Mount Lemmon Survey || 3:2 || align=right | 3.9 km || 
|-id=370 bgcolor=#d6d6d6
| 597370 ||  || — || February 21, 2007 || Mount Lemmon || Mount Lemmon Survey ||  || align=right | 2.6 km || 
|-id=371 bgcolor=#d6d6d6
| 597371 ||  || — || February 25, 2007 || Kitt Peak || Spacewatch ||  || align=right | 2.9 km || 
|-id=372 bgcolor=#fefefe
| 597372 ||  || — || February 16, 2007 || Mount Lemmon || Mount Lemmon Survey ||  || align=right data-sort-value="0.76" | 760 m || 
|-id=373 bgcolor=#fefefe
| 597373 ||  || — || February 21, 2007 || Mount Lemmon || Mount Lemmon Survey ||  || align=right data-sort-value="0.50" | 500 m || 
|-id=374 bgcolor=#d6d6d6
| 597374 ||  || — || February 25, 2007 || Kitt Peak || Spacewatch ||  || align=right | 2.8 km || 
|-id=375 bgcolor=#d6d6d6
| 597375 ||  || — || February 25, 2007 || Mount Lemmon || Mount Lemmon Survey ||  || align=right | 2.4 km || 
|-id=376 bgcolor=#d6d6d6
| 597376 ||  || — || February 25, 2007 || Kitt Peak || Spacewatch ||  || align=right | 2.7 km || 
|-id=377 bgcolor=#d6d6d6
| 597377 ||  || — || September 9, 2015 || Haleakala || Pan-STARRS ||  || align=right | 2.2 km || 
|-id=378 bgcolor=#d6d6d6
| 597378 ||  || — || February 21, 2007 || Mount Lemmon || Mount Lemmon Survey ||  || align=right | 2.5 km || 
|-id=379 bgcolor=#d6d6d6
| 597379 ||  || — || November 4, 2016 || Haleakala || Pan-STARRS ||  || align=right | 2.1 km || 
|-id=380 bgcolor=#C2FFFF
| 597380 ||  || — || February 25, 2007 || Mount Lemmon || Mount Lemmon Survey || L5 || align=right | 6.6 km || 
|-id=381 bgcolor=#E9E9E9
| 597381 ||  || — || February 25, 2007 || Kitt Peak || Spacewatch ||  || align=right data-sort-value="0.83" | 830 m || 
|-id=382 bgcolor=#d6d6d6
| 597382 ||  || — || February 26, 2007 || Mount Lemmon || Mount Lemmon Survey ||  || align=right | 2.3 km || 
|-id=383 bgcolor=#E9E9E9
| 597383 ||  || — || February 25, 2007 || Mount Lemmon || Mount Lemmon Survey ||  || align=right | 1.0 km || 
|-id=384 bgcolor=#d6d6d6
| 597384 ||  || — || February 25, 2007 || Kitt Peak || Spacewatch ||  || align=right | 2.1 km || 
|-id=385 bgcolor=#fefefe
| 597385 ||  || — || March 9, 2007 || Mount Lemmon || Mount Lemmon Survey ||  || align=right data-sort-value="0.79" | 790 m || 
|-id=386 bgcolor=#fefefe
| 597386 ||  || — || March 10, 2007 || Mount Lemmon || Mount Lemmon Survey ||  || align=right data-sort-value="0.75" | 750 m || 
|-id=387 bgcolor=#d6d6d6
| 597387 ||  || — || February 23, 2007 || Mount Lemmon || Mount Lemmon Survey ||  || align=right | 2.9 km || 
|-id=388 bgcolor=#E9E9E9
| 597388 ||  || — || March 10, 2007 || Mount Lemmon || Mount Lemmon Survey ||  || align=right | 1.0 km || 
|-id=389 bgcolor=#d6d6d6
| 597389 ||  || — || March 10, 2007 || Mount Lemmon || Mount Lemmon Survey ||  || align=right | 3.2 km || 
|-id=390 bgcolor=#E9E9E9
| 597390 ||  || — || March 10, 2007 || Kitt Peak || Spacewatch ||  || align=right | 1.4 km || 
|-id=391 bgcolor=#E9E9E9
| 597391 ||  || — || August 31, 2000 || Kitt Peak || Spacewatch ||  || align=right data-sort-value="0.97" | 970 m || 
|-id=392 bgcolor=#d6d6d6
| 597392 ||  || — || March 12, 2007 || Kitt Peak || Spacewatch ||  || align=right | 2.1 km || 
|-id=393 bgcolor=#d6d6d6
| 597393 ||  || — || February 8, 2007 || Mount Lemmon || Mount Lemmon Survey ||  || align=right | 2.4 km || 
|-id=394 bgcolor=#d6d6d6
| 597394 ||  || — || December 8, 2005 || Kitt Peak || Spacewatch ||  || align=right | 2.2 km || 
|-id=395 bgcolor=#E9E9E9
| 597395 ||  || — || March 10, 2007 || Kitt Peak || Spacewatch ||  || align=right data-sort-value="0.71" | 710 m || 
|-id=396 bgcolor=#d6d6d6
| 597396 ||  || — || March 10, 2007 || Kitt Peak || Spacewatch ||  || align=right | 3.2 km || 
|-id=397 bgcolor=#d6d6d6
| 597397 ||  || — || March 11, 2007 || Kitt Peak || Spacewatch ||  || align=right | 2.2 km || 
|-id=398 bgcolor=#d6d6d6
| 597398 ||  || — || March 12, 2007 || Mount Lemmon || Mount Lemmon Survey ||  || align=right | 2.6 km || 
|-id=399 bgcolor=#E9E9E9
| 597399 ||  || — || March 9, 2007 || Mount Lemmon || Mount Lemmon Survey ||  || align=right | 1.2 km || 
|-id=400 bgcolor=#d6d6d6
| 597400 ||  || — || March 9, 2007 || Mount Lemmon || Mount Lemmon Survey ||  || align=right | 2.1 km || 
|}

597401–597500 

|-bgcolor=#d6d6d6
| 597401 ||  || — || March 10, 2007 || Mount Lemmon || Mount Lemmon Survey ||  || align=right | 2.2 km || 
|-id=402 bgcolor=#d6d6d6
| 597402 ||  || — || March 11, 2007 || Kitt Peak || Spacewatch || 7:4 || align=right | 2.6 km || 
|-id=403 bgcolor=#fefefe
| 597403 ||  || — || February 25, 2007 || Mount Lemmon || Mount Lemmon Survey ||  || align=right data-sort-value="0.48" | 480 m || 
|-id=404 bgcolor=#d6d6d6
| 597404 ||  || — || March 11, 2007 || Kitt Peak || Spacewatch ||  || align=right | 2.7 km || 
|-id=405 bgcolor=#d6d6d6
| 597405 ||  || — || March 11, 2007 || Kitt Peak || Spacewatch ||  || align=right | 2.8 km || 
|-id=406 bgcolor=#d6d6d6
| 597406 ||  || — || March 11, 2007 || Kitt Peak || Spacewatch ||  || align=right | 2.3 km || 
|-id=407 bgcolor=#fefefe
| 597407 ||  || — || March 11, 2007 || Kitt Peak || Spacewatch ||  || align=right data-sort-value="0.58" | 580 m || 
|-id=408 bgcolor=#d6d6d6
| 597408 ||  || — || September 26, 2003 || Apache Point || SDSS Collaboration ||  || align=right | 3.2 km || 
|-id=409 bgcolor=#E9E9E9
| 597409 ||  || — || March 13, 2007 || Mount Lemmon || Mount Lemmon Survey ||  || align=right | 1.3 km || 
|-id=410 bgcolor=#d6d6d6
| 597410 ||  || — || October 10, 2004 || Kitt Peak || Spacewatch ||  || align=right | 3.0 km || 
|-id=411 bgcolor=#d6d6d6
| 597411 ||  || — || March 13, 2007 || Nyukasa || H. Kurosaki, A. Nakajima ||  || align=right | 2.8 km || 
|-id=412 bgcolor=#E9E9E9
| 597412 ||  || — || March 9, 2007 || Mount Lemmon || Mount Lemmon Survey ||  || align=right data-sort-value="0.88" | 880 m || 
|-id=413 bgcolor=#fefefe
| 597413 ||  || — || January 28, 2007 || Mount Lemmon || Mount Lemmon Survey ||  || align=right data-sort-value="0.63" | 630 m || 
|-id=414 bgcolor=#E9E9E9
| 597414 ||  || — || October 11, 2004 || Kitt Peak || L. H. Wasserman, J. R. Lovering ||  || align=right data-sort-value="0.90" | 900 m || 
|-id=415 bgcolor=#d6d6d6
| 597415 ||  || — || March 12, 2007 || Mount Lemmon || Mount Lemmon Survey ||  || align=right | 2.0 km || 
|-id=416 bgcolor=#d6d6d6
| 597416 ||  || — || March 12, 2007 || Mount Lemmon || Mount Lemmon Survey ||  || align=right | 2.3 km || 
|-id=417 bgcolor=#d6d6d6
| 597417 ||  || — || March 12, 2007 || Mount Lemmon || Mount Lemmon Survey ||  || align=right | 2.4 km || 
|-id=418 bgcolor=#d6d6d6
| 597418 ||  || — || March 14, 2007 || Mount Lemmon || Mount Lemmon Survey ||  || align=right | 2.2 km || 
|-id=419 bgcolor=#d6d6d6
| 597419 ||  || — || March 14, 2007 || Kitt Peak || Spacewatch ||  || align=right | 2.0 km || 
|-id=420 bgcolor=#fefefe
| 597420 ||  || — || March 15, 2007 || Mount Lemmon || Mount Lemmon Survey ||  || align=right data-sort-value="0.44" | 440 m || 
|-id=421 bgcolor=#d6d6d6
| 597421 ||  || — || March 13, 2007 || Kitt Peak || Spacewatch ||  || align=right | 3.0 km || 
|-id=422 bgcolor=#E9E9E9
| 597422 ||  || — || January 27, 2007 || Mount Lemmon || Mount Lemmon Survey ||  || align=right data-sort-value="0.96" | 960 m || 
|-id=423 bgcolor=#d6d6d6
| 597423 ||  || — || March 14, 2007 || Kitt Peak || Spacewatch ||  || align=right | 2.7 km || 
|-id=424 bgcolor=#fefefe
| 597424 ||  || — || March 14, 2007 || Kitt Peak || Spacewatch ||  || align=right data-sort-value="0.70" | 700 m || 
|-id=425 bgcolor=#E9E9E9
| 597425 ||  || — || March 14, 2007 || Mount Lemmon || Mount Lemmon Survey ||  || align=right | 1.3 km || 
|-id=426 bgcolor=#d6d6d6
| 597426 ||  || — || September 15, 2004 || Kitt Peak || Spacewatch ||  || align=right | 2.2 km || 
|-id=427 bgcolor=#E9E9E9
| 597427 ||  || — || February 26, 2007 || Mount Lemmon || Mount Lemmon Survey || (194) || align=right | 1.3 km || 
|-id=428 bgcolor=#E9E9E9
| 597428 ||  || — || March 15, 2007 || Kitt Peak || Spacewatch ||  || align=right data-sort-value="0.67" | 670 m || 
|-id=429 bgcolor=#fefefe
| 597429 ||  || — || March 11, 2003 || Palomar || NEAT ||  || align=right | 1.1 km || 
|-id=430 bgcolor=#d6d6d6
| 597430 ||  || — || February 16, 2007 || Palomar || NEAT ||  || align=right | 2.5 km || 
|-id=431 bgcolor=#E9E9E9
| 597431 ||  || — || March 13, 2007 || Mount Lemmon || Mount Lemmon Survey ||  || align=right | 2.2 km || 
|-id=432 bgcolor=#d6d6d6
| 597432 ||  || — || March 15, 2007 || Mount Lemmon || Mount Lemmon Survey ||  || align=right | 3.6 km || 
|-id=433 bgcolor=#d6d6d6
| 597433 ||  || — || November 12, 2010 || Mount Lemmon || Mount Lemmon Survey ||  || align=right | 2.4 km || 
|-id=434 bgcolor=#d6d6d6
| 597434 ||  || — || January 2, 2012 || Mount Lemmon || Mount Lemmon Survey ||  || align=right | 2.3 km || 
|-id=435 bgcolor=#d6d6d6
| 597435 ||  || — || March 14, 2007 || Kitt Peak || Spacewatch ||  || align=right | 2.3 km || 
|-id=436 bgcolor=#d6d6d6
| 597436 ||  || — || August 3, 2014 || Haleakala || Pan-STARRS ||  || align=right | 2.1 km || 
|-id=437 bgcolor=#d6d6d6
| 597437 ||  || — || November 11, 2010 || Mount Lemmon || Mount Lemmon Survey ||  || align=right | 2.8 km || 
|-id=438 bgcolor=#d6d6d6
| 597438 ||  || — || March 23, 2012 || Mount Lemmon || Mount Lemmon Survey ||  || align=right | 2.2 km || 
|-id=439 bgcolor=#E9E9E9
| 597439 ||  || — || December 7, 2013 || Haleakala || Pan-STARRS ||  || align=right | 1.1 km || 
|-id=440 bgcolor=#d6d6d6
| 597440 ||  || — || February 6, 2007 || Mount Lemmon || Mount Lemmon Survey ||  || align=right | 2.6 km || 
|-id=441 bgcolor=#d6d6d6
| 597441 ||  || — || June 5, 2013 || Mount Lemmon || Mount Lemmon Survey ||  || align=right | 2.7 km || 
|-id=442 bgcolor=#d6d6d6
| 597442 ||  || — || July 23, 2015 || Haleakala || Pan-STARRS ||  || align=right | 2.5 km || 
|-id=443 bgcolor=#d6d6d6
| 597443 ||  || — || March 19, 2013 || Haleakala || Pan-STARRS ||  || align=right | 2.0 km || 
|-id=444 bgcolor=#fefefe
| 597444 ||  || — || March 29, 2015 || Haleakala || Pan-STARRS ||  || align=right data-sort-value="0.61" | 610 m || 
|-id=445 bgcolor=#E9E9E9
| 597445 ||  || — || September 27, 2009 || Kitt Peak || Spacewatch ||  || align=right data-sort-value="0.76" | 760 m || 
|-id=446 bgcolor=#d6d6d6
| 597446 ||  || — || March 13, 2007 || Kitt Peak || Spacewatch ||  || align=right | 3.3 km || 
|-id=447 bgcolor=#fefefe
| 597447 ||  || — || March 12, 2007 || Mount Lemmon || Mount Lemmon Survey ||  || align=right data-sort-value="0.57" | 570 m || 
|-id=448 bgcolor=#d6d6d6
| 597448 ||  || — || March 10, 2007 || Kitt Peak || Spacewatch ||  || align=right | 2.2 km || 
|-id=449 bgcolor=#fefefe
| 597449 ||  || — || March 11, 2007 || Mount Lemmon || Mount Lemmon Survey ||  || align=right data-sort-value="0.46" | 460 m || 
|-id=450 bgcolor=#fefefe
| 597450 ||  || — || March 16, 2007 || Kitt Peak || Spacewatch ||  || align=right | 1.0 km || 
|-id=451 bgcolor=#d6d6d6
| 597451 ||  || — || February 27, 2007 || Kitt Peak || Spacewatch ||  || align=right | 3.0 km || 
|-id=452 bgcolor=#E9E9E9
| 597452 ||  || — || March 10, 2007 || Mount Lemmon || Mount Lemmon Survey ||  || align=right data-sort-value="0.99" | 990 m || 
|-id=453 bgcolor=#d6d6d6
| 597453 ||  || — || March 20, 2007 || Kitt Peak || Spacewatch ||  || align=right | 2.8 km || 
|-id=454 bgcolor=#E9E9E9
| 597454 ||  || — || March 20, 2007 || Mount Lemmon || Mount Lemmon Survey ||  || align=right | 1.8 km || 
|-id=455 bgcolor=#d6d6d6
| 597455 ||  || — || March 18, 2007 || Kitt Peak || Spacewatch ||  || align=right | 2.6 km || 
|-id=456 bgcolor=#E9E9E9
| 597456 ||  || — || March 26, 2007 || Kitt Peak || Spacewatch ||  || align=right | 1.1 km || 
|-id=457 bgcolor=#d6d6d6
| 597457 ||  || — || January 2, 2012 || Mount Lemmon || Mount Lemmon Survey ||  || align=right | 2.7 km || 
|-id=458 bgcolor=#d6d6d6
| 597458 ||  || — || April 10, 2013 || Haleakala || Pan-STARRS ||  || align=right | 2.1 km || 
|-id=459 bgcolor=#E9E9E9
| 597459 ||  || — || March 26, 2007 || Mount Lemmon || Mount Lemmon Survey ||  || align=right data-sort-value="0.63" | 630 m || 
|-id=460 bgcolor=#d6d6d6
| 597460 ||  || — || March 26, 2007 || Mount Lemmon || Mount Lemmon Survey ||  || align=right | 2.2 km || 
|-id=461 bgcolor=#d6d6d6
| 597461 ||  || — || March 25, 2007 || Mount Lemmon || Mount Lemmon Survey ||  || align=right | 2.5 km || 
|-id=462 bgcolor=#d6d6d6
| 597462 ||  || — || April 8, 2007 || Altschwendt || W. Ries ||  || align=right | 2.8 km || 
|-id=463 bgcolor=#E9E9E9
| 597463 ||  || — || March 23, 2003 || Kitt Peak || Spacewatch ||  || align=right data-sort-value="0.89" | 890 m || 
|-id=464 bgcolor=#d6d6d6
| 597464 ||  || — || March 11, 2007 || Kitt Peak || Spacewatch ||  || align=right | 2.8 km || 
|-id=465 bgcolor=#E9E9E9
| 597465 ||  || — || November 29, 2005 || Kitt Peak || Spacewatch ||  || align=right | 1.1 km || 
|-id=466 bgcolor=#E9E9E9
| 597466 ||  || — || March 31, 2007 || Palomar || NEAT ||  || align=right | 2.3 km || 
|-id=467 bgcolor=#fefefe
| 597467 ||  || — || April 11, 2007 || Mount Lemmon || Mount Lemmon Survey ||  || align=right data-sort-value="0.48" | 480 m || 
|-id=468 bgcolor=#E9E9E9
| 597468 ||  || — || April 14, 2007 || Kitt Peak || Spacewatch ||  || align=right | 1.1 km || 
|-id=469 bgcolor=#d6d6d6
| 597469 ||  || — || April 7, 2007 || Mauna Kea || Mauna Kea Obs. ||  || align=right | 2.2 km || 
|-id=470 bgcolor=#d6d6d6
| 597470 ||  || — || April 15, 2007 || Mauna Kea || Mauna Kea Obs. ||  || align=right | 2.2 km || 
|-id=471 bgcolor=#E9E9E9
| 597471 ||  || — || April 15, 2007 || Kitt Peak || Spacewatch ||  || align=right | 1.9 km || 
|-id=472 bgcolor=#d6d6d6
| 597472 ||  || — || March 26, 2007 || Catalina || CSS ||  || align=right | 2.9 km || 
|-id=473 bgcolor=#d6d6d6
| 597473 ||  || — || November 2, 2010 || Mount Lemmon || Mount Lemmon Survey ||  || align=right | 2.5 km || 
|-id=474 bgcolor=#d6d6d6
| 597474 ||  || — || February 22, 2007 || Kitt Peak || Spacewatch ||  || align=right | 2.9 km || 
|-id=475 bgcolor=#d6d6d6
| 597475 ||  || — || July 27, 2014 || Haleakala || Pan-STARRS ||  || align=right | 2.6 km || 
|-id=476 bgcolor=#d6d6d6
| 597476 ||  || — || April 11, 2007 || Mount Lemmon || Mount Lemmon Survey ||  || align=right | 2.5 km || 
|-id=477 bgcolor=#fefefe
| 597477 ||  || — || April 16, 2007 || Bergisch Gladbach || W. Bickel || H || align=right data-sort-value="0.61" | 610 m || 
|-id=478 bgcolor=#E9E9E9
| 597478 ||  || — || April 18, 2007 || 7300 || W. K. Y. Yeung ||  || align=right data-sort-value="0.97" | 970 m || 
|-id=479 bgcolor=#E9E9E9
| 597479 ||  || — || April 18, 2007 || Desert Moon || B. L. Stevens ||  || align=right | 1.4 km || 
|-id=480 bgcolor=#E9E9E9
| 597480 ||  || — || April 18, 2007 || Kitt Peak || Spacewatch ||  || align=right data-sort-value="0.86" | 860 m || 
|-id=481 bgcolor=#E9E9E9
| 597481 ||  || — || April 18, 2007 || Kitt Peak || Spacewatch ||  || align=right data-sort-value="0.67" | 670 m || 
|-id=482 bgcolor=#E9E9E9
| 597482 ||  || — || March 14, 2007 || Kitt Peak || Spacewatch ||  || align=right | 1.2 km || 
|-id=483 bgcolor=#E9E9E9
| 597483 ||  || — || April 19, 2007 || Mount Lemmon || Mount Lemmon Survey ||  || align=right | 1.2 km || 
|-id=484 bgcolor=#E9E9E9
| 597484 ||  || — || April 22, 2007 || Mount Lemmon || Mount Lemmon Survey ||  || align=right | 1.0 km || 
|-id=485 bgcolor=#d6d6d6
| 597485 ||  || — || May 12, 1996 || Kitt Peak || Spacewatch ||  || align=right | 2.9 km || 
|-id=486 bgcolor=#fefefe
| 597486 ||  || — || April 20, 2007 || Kitt Peak || Spacewatch ||  || align=right data-sort-value="0.50" | 500 m || 
|-id=487 bgcolor=#d6d6d6
| 597487 ||  || — || April 22, 2007 || Kitt Peak || Spacewatch ||  || align=right | 2.5 km || 
|-id=488 bgcolor=#fefefe
| 597488 ||  || — || April 22, 2007 || Kitt Peak || Spacewatch ||  || align=right data-sort-value="0.51" | 510 m || 
|-id=489 bgcolor=#E9E9E9
| 597489 ||  || — || April 20, 2007 || Kitt Peak || Spacewatch ||  || align=right data-sort-value="0.91" | 910 m || 
|-id=490 bgcolor=#fefefe
| 597490 ||  || — || April 22, 2007 || Mount Lemmon || Mount Lemmon Survey ||  || align=right data-sort-value="0.49" | 490 m || 
|-id=491 bgcolor=#d6d6d6
| 597491 ||  || — || April 22, 2007 || Mount Lemmon || Mount Lemmon Survey ||  || align=right | 2.5 km || 
|-id=492 bgcolor=#E9E9E9
| 597492 ||  || — || April 22, 2007 || Kitt Peak || Spacewatch ||  || align=right data-sort-value="0.75" | 750 m || 
|-id=493 bgcolor=#E9E9E9
| 597493 ||  || — || August 27, 2000 || Cerro Tololo || R. Millis, L. H. Wasserman ||  || align=right data-sort-value="0.88" | 880 m || 
|-id=494 bgcolor=#d6d6d6
| 597494 ||  || — || March 25, 2007 || Mount Lemmon || Mount Lemmon Survey ||  || align=right | 2.6 km || 
|-id=495 bgcolor=#E9E9E9
| 597495 ||  || — || April 24, 2007 || Kitt Peak || Spacewatch ||  || align=right | 1.4 km || 
|-id=496 bgcolor=#FA8072
| 597496 ||  || — || April 22, 2007 || Kitt Peak || Spacewatch ||  || align=right data-sort-value="0.59" | 590 m || 
|-id=497 bgcolor=#d6d6d6
| 597497 ||  || — || April 23, 2007 || Catalina || CSS ||  || align=right | 3.5 km || 
|-id=498 bgcolor=#d6d6d6
| 597498 ||  || — || April 19, 2007 || Mount Lemmon || Mount Lemmon Survey ||  || align=right | 3.1 km || 
|-id=499 bgcolor=#d6d6d6
| 597499 ||  || — || April 26, 2007 || Mount Lemmon || Mount Lemmon Survey ||  || align=right | 2.4 km || 
|-id=500 bgcolor=#fefefe
| 597500 ||  || — || August 30, 2014 || Haleakala || Pan-STARRS ||  || align=right data-sort-value="0.64" | 640 m || 
|}

597501–597600 

|-bgcolor=#d6d6d6
| 597501 ||  || — || February 19, 2007 || Mount Lemmon || Mount Lemmon Survey ||  || align=right | 2.0 km || 
|-id=502 bgcolor=#fefefe
| 597502 ||  || — || April 18, 2007 || Kitt Peak || Spacewatch ||  || align=right data-sort-value="0.76" | 760 m || 
|-id=503 bgcolor=#E9E9E9
| 597503 ||  || — || October 16, 2009 || Mount Lemmon || Mount Lemmon Survey ||  || align=right data-sort-value="0.68" | 680 m || 
|-id=504 bgcolor=#d6d6d6
| 597504 ||  || — || April 20, 2013 || Kitt Peak || Spacewatch ||  || align=right | 2.8 km || 
|-id=505 bgcolor=#d6d6d6
| 597505 ||  || — || March 17, 2018 || Haleakala || Pan-STARRS ||  || align=right | 2.5 km || 
|-id=506 bgcolor=#d6d6d6
| 597506 ||  || — || September 20, 2014 || Haleakala || Pan-STARRS ||  || align=right | 2.1 km || 
|-id=507 bgcolor=#E9E9E9
| 597507 ||  || — || April 23, 2007 || Kitt Peak || Spacewatch ||  || align=right | 1.4 km || 
|-id=508 bgcolor=#fefefe
| 597508 ||  || — || April 26, 2007 || Kitt Peak || Spacewatch ||  || align=right data-sort-value="0.48" | 480 m || 
|-id=509 bgcolor=#E9E9E9
| 597509 ||  || — || April 20, 2007 || Kitt Peak || Spacewatch ||  || align=right data-sort-value="0.98" | 980 m || 
|-id=510 bgcolor=#d6d6d6
| 597510 ||  || — || April 22, 2007 || Mount Lemmon || Mount Lemmon Survey ||  || align=right | 2.4 km || 
|-id=511 bgcolor=#E9E9E9
| 597511 ||  || — || April 18, 2007 || Mount Lemmon || Mount Lemmon Survey ||  || align=right data-sort-value="0.62" | 620 m || 
|-id=512 bgcolor=#E9E9E9
| 597512 ||  || — || April 19, 2007 || Kitt Peak || Spacewatch ||  || align=right | 1.8 km || 
|-id=513 bgcolor=#E9E9E9
| 597513 ||  || — || May 10, 2007 || Mount Lemmon || Mount Lemmon Survey ||  || align=right data-sort-value="0.67" | 670 m || 
|-id=514 bgcolor=#d6d6d6
| 597514 ||  || — || May 14, 2007 || Siding Spring || SSS || Tj (2.98) || align=right | 3.0 km || 
|-id=515 bgcolor=#E9E9E9
| 597515 ||  || — || May 9, 2007 || Mount Lemmon || Mount Lemmon Survey ||  || align=right | 2.3 km || 
|-id=516 bgcolor=#E9E9E9
| 597516 ||  || — || April 19, 2007 || Mount Lemmon || Mount Lemmon Survey ||  || align=right | 1.0 km || 
|-id=517 bgcolor=#fefefe
| 597517 ||  || — || May 15, 2007 || Mount Lemmon || Mount Lemmon Survey || H || align=right data-sort-value="0.62" | 620 m || 
|-id=518 bgcolor=#E9E9E9
| 597518 ||  || — || May 9, 2007 || Mount Lemmon || Mount Lemmon Survey ||  || align=right | 1.9 km || 
|-id=519 bgcolor=#fefefe
| 597519 ||  || — || May 12, 2007 || Mount Lemmon || Mount Lemmon Survey ||  || align=right data-sort-value="0.70" | 700 m || 
|-id=520 bgcolor=#d6d6d6
| 597520 ||  || — || September 18, 2009 || Mount Lemmon || Mount Lemmon Survey ||  || align=right | 2.4 km || 
|-id=521 bgcolor=#E9E9E9
| 597521 ||  || — || April 3, 2011 || Haleakala || Pan-STARRS ||  || align=right | 1.2 km || 
|-id=522 bgcolor=#E9E9E9
| 597522 ||  || — || November 27, 2013 || Haleakala || Pan-STARRS ||  || align=right data-sort-value="0.83" | 830 m || 
|-id=523 bgcolor=#E9E9E9
| 597523 ||  || — || February 26, 2007 || Mount Lemmon || Mount Lemmon Survey ||  || align=right data-sort-value="0.72" | 720 m || 
|-id=524 bgcolor=#fefefe
| 597524 ||  || — || May 16, 2007 || Mount Lemmon || Mount Lemmon Survey ||  || align=right data-sort-value="0.58" | 580 m || 
|-id=525 bgcolor=#C2FFFF
| 597525 ||  || — || September 16, 2012 || Kitt Peak || Spacewatch || L5 || align=right | 7.5 km || 
|-id=526 bgcolor=#E9E9E9
| 597526 ||  || — || February 20, 2015 || Haleakala || Pan-STARRS ||  || align=right | 1.2 km || 
|-id=527 bgcolor=#E9E9E9
| 597527 ||  || — || June 7, 2007 || Piszkesteto || Piszkéstető Stn. ||  || align=right data-sort-value="0.98" | 980 m || 
|-id=528 bgcolor=#d6d6d6
| 597528 ||  || — || June 9, 2007 || Kitt Peak || Spacewatch ||  || align=right | 2.7 km || 
|-id=529 bgcolor=#E9E9E9
| 597529 ||  || — || June 10, 2007 || Kitt Peak || Spacewatch ||  || align=right data-sort-value="0.84" | 840 m || 
|-id=530 bgcolor=#E9E9E9
| 597530 ||  || — || April 25, 2007 || Kitt Peak || Spacewatch ||  || align=right | 1.1 km || 
|-id=531 bgcolor=#E9E9E9
| 597531 ||  || — || June 14, 2007 || Kitt Peak || Spacewatch ||  || align=right | 1.5 km || 
|-id=532 bgcolor=#E9E9E9
| 597532 ||  || — || June 15, 2007 || Kitt Peak || Spacewatch ||  || align=right | 1.3 km || 
|-id=533 bgcolor=#d6d6d6
| 597533 ||  || — || April 25, 2007 || Mount Lemmon || Mount Lemmon Survey || Tj (2.98) || align=right | 2.9 km || 
|-id=534 bgcolor=#E9E9E9
| 597534 ||  || — || January 20, 2015 || Haleakala || Pan-STARRS ||  || align=right data-sort-value="0.79" | 790 m || 
|-id=535 bgcolor=#E9E9E9
| 597535 ||  || — || February 18, 2015 || Haleakala || Pan-STARRS ||  || align=right | 1.2 km || 
|-id=536 bgcolor=#E9E9E9
| 597536 ||  || — || April 25, 2015 || Haleakala || Pan-STARRS ||  || align=right data-sort-value="0.76" | 760 m || 
|-id=537 bgcolor=#E9E9E9
| 597537 ||  || — || June 21, 2007 || Mount Lemmon || Mount Lemmon Survey ||  || align=right | 1.6 km || 
|-id=538 bgcolor=#E9E9E9
| 597538 ||  || — || June 21, 2007 || Mount Lemmon || Mount Lemmon Survey ||  || align=right | 1.7 km || 
|-id=539 bgcolor=#fefefe
| 597539 ||  || — || June 15, 2007 || Kitt Peak || Spacewatch ||  || align=right data-sort-value="0.64" | 640 m || 
|-id=540 bgcolor=#E9E9E9
| 597540 ||  || — || April 24, 2006 || Bergisch Gladbach || W. Bickel ||  || align=right | 1.6 km || 
|-id=541 bgcolor=#fefefe
| 597541 ||  || — || June 23, 2007 || Kitt Peak || Spacewatch ||  || align=right data-sort-value="0.62" | 620 m || 
|-id=542 bgcolor=#fefefe
| 597542 ||  || — || November 21, 2008 || Mount Lemmon || Mount Lemmon Survey ||  || align=right data-sort-value="0.69" | 690 m || 
|-id=543 bgcolor=#d6d6d6
| 597543 ||  || — || November 3, 2016 || Haleakala || Pan-STARRS ||  || align=right | 3.6 km || 
|-id=544 bgcolor=#E9E9E9
| 597544 ||  || — || November 4, 2016 || Haleakala || Pan-STARRS ||  || align=right data-sort-value="0.76" | 760 m || 
|-id=545 bgcolor=#E9E9E9
| 597545 ||  || — || June 20, 2007 || Kitt Peak || Spacewatch ||  || align=right data-sort-value="0.77" | 770 m || 
|-id=546 bgcolor=#E9E9E9
| 597546 ||  || — || July 6, 2007 || Pla D'Arguines || R. Ferrando, M. Ferrando ||  || align=right | 1.2 km || 
|-id=547 bgcolor=#FA8072
| 597547 ||  || — || July 16, 2007 || Socorro || LINEAR ||  || align=right data-sort-value="0.79" | 790 m || 
|-id=548 bgcolor=#E9E9E9
| 597548 ||  || — || July 19, 2007 || Cordell-Lorenz || D. T. Durig, D. S. Hardage ||  || align=right | 1.4 km || 
|-id=549 bgcolor=#fefefe
| 597549 ||  || — || July 21, 2007 || Charleston || R. Holmes ||  || align=right data-sort-value="0.86" | 860 m || 
|-id=550 bgcolor=#d6d6d6
| 597550 ||  || — || July 24, 2007 || Mauna Kea || Mauna Kea Obs. ||  || align=right | 2.4 km || 
|-id=551 bgcolor=#E9E9E9
| 597551 ||  || — || August 25, 2003 || Cerro Tololo || Cerro Tololo Obs. ||  || align=right data-sort-value="0.87" | 870 m || 
|-id=552 bgcolor=#E9E9E9
| 597552 ||  || — || July 18, 2007 || Mount Lemmon || Mount Lemmon Survey ||  || align=right | 1.1 km || 
|-id=553 bgcolor=#E9E9E9
| 597553 ||  || — || August 11, 2007 || Palomar Mountain || Palomar Obs. || critical || align=right data-sort-value="0.73" | 730 m || 
|-id=554 bgcolor=#fefefe
| 597554 ||  || — || August 13, 2007 || XuYi || PMO NEO ||  || align=right data-sort-value="0.54" | 540 m || 
|-id=555 bgcolor=#fefefe
| 597555 ||  || — || August 8, 2007 || Vail-Jarnac || Jarnac Obs. ||  || align=right data-sort-value="0.80" | 800 m || 
|-id=556 bgcolor=#fefefe
| 597556 ||  || — || August 10, 2007 || Kitt Peak || Spacewatch ||  || align=right data-sort-value="0.57" | 570 m || 
|-id=557 bgcolor=#fefefe
| 597557 ||  || — || September 8, 2007 || Anderson Mesa || LONEOS ||  || align=right data-sort-value="0.54" | 540 m || 
|-id=558 bgcolor=#E9E9E9
| 597558 ||  || — || August 23, 2007 || Kitt Peak || Spacewatch ||  || align=right | 2.0 km || 
|-id=559 bgcolor=#E9E9E9
| 597559 ||  || — || August 23, 2007 || Kitt Peak || Spacewatch ||  || align=right | 1.7 km || 
|-id=560 bgcolor=#fefefe
| 597560 ||  || — || September 25, 2014 || Kitt Peak || Spacewatch ||  || align=right data-sort-value="0.69" | 690 m || 
|-id=561 bgcolor=#C2FFFF
| 597561 ||  || — || September 2, 2007 || Siding Spring || K. Sárneczky, L. Kiss || L4 || align=right | 6.0 km || 
|-id=562 bgcolor=#fefefe
| 597562 ||  || — || September 11, 2007 || Mount Lemmon || Mount Lemmon Survey || H || align=right data-sort-value="0.81" | 810 m || 
|-id=563 bgcolor=#fefefe
| 597563 ||  || — || September 11, 2007 || Palomar Mountain || Palomar Obs. || (2076) || align=right data-sort-value="0.79" | 790 m || 
|-id=564 bgcolor=#fefefe
| 597564 ||  || — || September 12, 2007 || Saint-Sulpice || B. Christophe ||  || align=right data-sort-value="0.52" | 520 m || 
|-id=565 bgcolor=#E9E9E9
| 597565 ||  || — || September 5, 2007 || Catalina || CSS ||  || align=right | 1.6 km || 
|-id=566 bgcolor=#E9E9E9
| 597566 ||  || — || September 9, 2007 || Kitt Peak || Spacewatch ||  || align=right | 1.6 km || 
|-id=567 bgcolor=#d6d6d6
| 597567 ||  || — || September 10, 2007 || Mount Lemmon || Mount Lemmon Survey ||  || align=right | 3.1 km || 
|-id=568 bgcolor=#d6d6d6
| 597568 ||  || — || September 10, 2007 || Mount Lemmon || Mount Lemmon Survey ||  || align=right | 2.9 km || 
|-id=569 bgcolor=#E9E9E9
| 597569 ||  || — || September 10, 2007 || Mount Lemmon || Mount Lemmon Survey ||  || align=right | 1.6 km || 
|-id=570 bgcolor=#E9E9E9
| 597570 ||  || — || March 4, 2005 || Kitt Peak || Spacewatch ||  || align=right | 1.5 km || 
|-id=571 bgcolor=#fefefe
| 597571 ||  || — || September 10, 2007 || Kitt Peak || Spacewatch ||  || align=right data-sort-value="0.49" | 490 m || 
|-id=572 bgcolor=#fefefe
| 597572 ||  || — || April 1, 2003 || Palomar || NEAT ||  || align=right data-sort-value="0.71" | 710 m || 
|-id=573 bgcolor=#E9E9E9
| 597573 ||  || — || September 11, 2007 || Kitt Peak || Spacewatch ||  || align=right data-sort-value="0.87" | 870 m || 
|-id=574 bgcolor=#E9E9E9
| 597574 ||  || — || September 12, 2007 || Mount Lemmon || Mount Lemmon Survey || GEF || align=right | 1.0 km || 
|-id=575 bgcolor=#fefefe
| 597575 ||  || — || March 3, 2006 || Catalina || CSS ||  || align=right | 1.2 km || 
|-id=576 bgcolor=#fefefe
| 597576 ||  || — || August 24, 2007 || Kitt Peak || Spacewatch ||  || align=right data-sort-value="0.52" | 520 m || 
|-id=577 bgcolor=#E9E9E9
| 597577 ||  || — || October 17, 2003 || Kitt Peak || Spacewatch ||  || align=right | 1.5 km || 
|-id=578 bgcolor=#E9E9E9
| 597578 ||  || — || September 11, 2007 || Mount Lemmon || Mount Lemmon Survey ||  || align=right | 1.7 km || 
|-id=579 bgcolor=#fefefe
| 597579 ||  || — || September 12, 2007 || Mount Lemmon || Mount Lemmon Survey ||  || align=right data-sort-value="0.65" | 650 m || 
|-id=580 bgcolor=#E9E9E9
| 597580 ||  || — || September 13, 2007 || Mount Lemmon || Mount Lemmon Survey ||  || align=right | 2.0 km || 
|-id=581 bgcolor=#E9E9E9
| 597581 ||  || — || September 11, 2007 || Kitt Peak || Spacewatch ||  || align=right | 1.9 km || 
|-id=582 bgcolor=#E9E9E9
| 597582 ||  || — || September 11, 2007 || Kitt Peak || Spacewatch ||  || align=right | 1.3 km || 
|-id=583 bgcolor=#fefefe
| 597583 ||  || — || September 13, 2007 || Mount Lemmon || Mount Lemmon Survey ||  || align=right data-sort-value="0.48" | 480 m || 
|-id=584 bgcolor=#E9E9E9
| 597584 ||  || — || September 13, 2007 || Mount Lemmon || Mount Lemmon Survey ||  || align=right | 1.2 km || 
|-id=585 bgcolor=#d6d6d6
| 597585 ||  || — || September 10, 2007 || Kitt Peak || Spacewatch ||  || align=right | 2.1 km || 
|-id=586 bgcolor=#E9E9E9
| 597586 ||  || — || September 10, 2007 || Kitt Peak || Spacewatch ||  || align=right | 1.9 km || 
|-id=587 bgcolor=#E9E9E9
| 597587 ||  || — || February 14, 2005 || Catalina || CSS ||  || align=right | 2.4 km || 
|-id=588 bgcolor=#E9E9E9
| 597588 ||  || — || September 11, 2007 || Kitt Peak || Spacewatch ||  || align=right | 2.3 km || 
|-id=589 bgcolor=#fefefe
| 597589 ||  || — || September 11, 2007 || Kitt Peak || Spacewatch ||  || align=right data-sort-value="0.74" | 740 m || 
|-id=590 bgcolor=#E9E9E9
| 597590 ||  || — || September 12, 2007 || Kitt Peak || Spacewatch ||  || align=right | 1.2 km || 
|-id=591 bgcolor=#d6d6d6
| 597591 ||  || — || September 14, 2007 || Mount Lemmon || Mount Lemmon Survey ||  || align=right | 1.9 km || 
|-id=592 bgcolor=#E9E9E9
| 597592 ||  || — || September 14, 2007 || Mount Lemmon || Mount Lemmon Survey ||  || align=right | 1.7 km || 
|-id=593 bgcolor=#E9E9E9
| 597593 ||  || — || September 14, 2007 || Mount Lemmon || Mount Lemmon Survey ||  || align=right | 1.7 km || 
|-id=594 bgcolor=#E9E9E9
| 597594 ||  || — || September 14, 2007 || Mount Lemmon || Mount Lemmon Survey ||  || align=right | 1.8 km || 
|-id=595 bgcolor=#E9E9E9
| 597595 ||  || — || September 14, 2007 || Mount Lemmon || Mount Lemmon Survey ||  || align=right | 1.4 km || 
|-id=596 bgcolor=#fefefe
| 597596 ||  || — || September 12, 2007 || Catalina || CSS ||  || align=right data-sort-value="0.53" | 530 m || 
|-id=597 bgcolor=#E9E9E9
| 597597 ||  || — || September 10, 2007 || Catalina || CSS ||  || align=right | 2.1 km || 
|-id=598 bgcolor=#fefefe
| 597598 ||  || — || September 13, 2007 || Kitt Peak || Spacewatch ||  || align=right data-sort-value="0.58" | 580 m || 
|-id=599 bgcolor=#E9E9E9
| 597599 ||  || — || March 2, 2006 || Mount Lemmon || Mount Lemmon Survey ||  || align=right | 1.8 km || 
|-id=600 bgcolor=#fefefe
| 597600 ||  || — || September 14, 2007 || Kitt Peak || Spacewatch ||  || align=right data-sort-value="0.49" | 490 m || 
|}

597601–597700 

|-bgcolor=#E9E9E9
| 597601 ||  || — || September 14, 2007 || Mount Lemmon || Mount Lemmon Survey ||  || align=right | 1.6 km || 
|-id=602 bgcolor=#fefefe
| 597602 ||  || — || May 2, 2003 || Kitt Peak || Spacewatch ||  || align=right data-sort-value="0.67" | 670 m || 
|-id=603 bgcolor=#fefefe
| 597603 ||  || — || September 14, 2007 || Kitt Peak || Spacewatch ||  || align=right data-sort-value="0.67" | 670 m || 
|-id=604 bgcolor=#E9E9E9
| 597604 ||  || — || September 14, 2007 || Kitt Peak || Spacewatch ||  || align=right | 1.9 km || 
|-id=605 bgcolor=#E9E9E9
| 597605 ||  || — || September 15, 2007 || Mount Lemmon || Mount Lemmon Survey ||  || align=right | 1.3 km || 
|-id=606 bgcolor=#d6d6d6
| 597606 ||  || — || July 19, 2007 || Mount Lemmon || Mount Lemmon Survey || 7:4 || align=right | 3.4 km || 
|-id=607 bgcolor=#E9E9E9
| 597607 ||  || — || September 15, 2007 || Kitt Peak || Spacewatch ||  || align=right | 1.8 km || 
|-id=608 bgcolor=#E9E9E9
| 597608 ||  || — || September 13, 2007 || Catalina || CSS ||  || align=right | 1.4 km || 
|-id=609 bgcolor=#E9E9E9
| 597609 ||  || — || September 13, 2007 || Catalina || CSS ||  || align=right | 1.6 km || 
|-id=610 bgcolor=#E9E9E9
| 597610 ||  || — || September 13, 2007 || Kitt Peak || Spacewatch ||  || align=right data-sort-value="0.74" | 740 m || 
|-id=611 bgcolor=#E9E9E9
| 597611 ||  || — || September 2, 2007 || Mount Lemmon || Mount Lemmon Survey || EUN || align=right | 1.2 km || 
|-id=612 bgcolor=#C2FFFF
| 597612 ||  || — || September 14, 2007 || Kitt Peak || Spacewatch || L4 || align=right | 6.1 km || 
|-id=613 bgcolor=#fefefe
| 597613 ||  || — || September 9, 2007 || Kitt Peak || Spacewatch ||  || align=right data-sort-value="0.64" | 640 m || 
|-id=614 bgcolor=#C2E0FF
| 597614 ||  || — || September 14, 2007 || Mauna Kea || Mauna Kea Obs. || SDOcritical || align=right | 227 km || 
|-id=615 bgcolor=#d6d6d6
| 597615 ||  || — || September 5, 2007 || Lulin || LUSS ||  || align=right | 2.4 km || 
|-id=616 bgcolor=#fefefe
| 597616 ||  || — || September 14, 2007 || Mount Lemmon || Mount Lemmon Survey ||  || align=right data-sort-value="0.59" | 590 m || 
|-id=617 bgcolor=#E9E9E9
| 597617 ||  || — || September 15, 2007 || Kitt Peak || Spacewatch ||  || align=right | 1.2 km || 
|-id=618 bgcolor=#E9E9E9
| 597618 ||  || — || September 4, 2007 || Mount Lemmon || Mount Lemmon Survey ||  || align=right | 1.4 km || 
|-id=619 bgcolor=#fefefe
| 597619 ||  || — || September 12, 2007 || Catalina || CSS ||  || align=right data-sort-value="0.70" | 700 m || 
|-id=620 bgcolor=#E9E9E9
| 597620 ||  || — || September 12, 2007 || Mount Lemmon || Mount Lemmon Survey ||  || align=right | 1.9 km || 
|-id=621 bgcolor=#fefefe
| 597621 ||  || — || September 13, 2007 || Mount Lemmon || Mount Lemmon Survey ||  || align=right data-sort-value="0.54" | 540 m || 
|-id=622 bgcolor=#E9E9E9
| 597622 ||  || — || February 15, 2010 || Kitt Peak || Spacewatch ||  || align=right | 1.7 km || 
|-id=623 bgcolor=#fefefe
| 597623 ||  || — || September 10, 2007 || Kitt Peak || Spacewatch ||  || align=right data-sort-value="0.68" | 680 m || 
|-id=624 bgcolor=#E9E9E9
| 597624 ||  || — || January 20, 2009 || Mount Lemmon || Mount Lemmon Survey ||  || align=right | 1.4 km || 
|-id=625 bgcolor=#E9E9E9
| 597625 ||  || — || October 1, 2016 || Mount Lemmon || Mount Lemmon Survey ||  || align=right | 1.3 km || 
|-id=626 bgcolor=#E9E9E9
| 597626 ||  || — || May 1, 2011 || Haleakala || Pan-STARRS ||  || align=right | 1.2 km || 
|-id=627 bgcolor=#E9E9E9
| 597627 ||  || — || August 30, 1998 || Kitt Peak || Spacewatch ||  || align=right | 1.5 km || 
|-id=628 bgcolor=#E9E9E9
| 597628 ||  || — || September 14, 2007 || Catalina || CSS ||  || align=right | 1.5 km || 
|-id=629 bgcolor=#C2FFFF
| 597629 ||  || — || June 18, 2018 || Haleakala || Pan-STARRS || L4 || align=right | 6.4 km || 
|-id=630 bgcolor=#C2FFFF
| 597630 ||  || — || September 29, 2009 || Mount Lemmon || Mount Lemmon Survey || L4 || align=right | 6.8 km || 
|-id=631 bgcolor=#C2FFFF
| 597631 ||  || — || September 10, 2007 || Mount Lemmon || Mount Lemmon Survey || L4 || align=right | 6.0 km || 
|-id=632 bgcolor=#E9E9E9
| 597632 ||  || — || June 13, 2015 || Haleakala || Pan-STARRS ||  || align=right | 1.5 km || 
|-id=633 bgcolor=#E9E9E9
| 597633 ||  || — || September 10, 2007 || Mount Lemmon || Mount Lemmon Survey ||  || align=right | 1.8 km || 
|-id=634 bgcolor=#E9E9E9
| 597634 ||  || — || September 11, 2007 || Kitt Peak || Spacewatch ||  || align=right | 1.5 km || 
|-id=635 bgcolor=#E9E9E9
| 597635 ||  || — || September 10, 2007 || Kitt Peak || Spacewatch ||  || align=right | 1.2 km || 
|-id=636 bgcolor=#E9E9E9
| 597636 ||  || — || September 10, 2007 || Mount Lemmon || Mount Lemmon Survey ||  || align=right | 1.4 km || 
|-id=637 bgcolor=#fefefe
| 597637 ||  || — || September 13, 2007 || Catalina || CSS ||  || align=right data-sort-value="0.64" | 640 m || 
|-id=638 bgcolor=#E9E9E9
| 597638 ||  || — || September 14, 2007 || Mount Lemmon || Mount Lemmon Survey ||  || align=right | 1.7 km || 
|-id=639 bgcolor=#E9E9E9
| 597639 ||  || — || September 12, 2007 || Mount Lemmon || Mount Lemmon Survey ||  || align=right | 1.8 km || 
|-id=640 bgcolor=#C2FFFF
| 597640 ||  || — || September 10, 2007 || Mount Lemmon || Mount Lemmon Survey || L4 || align=right | 5.6 km || 
|-id=641 bgcolor=#E9E9E9
| 597641 ||  || — || September 13, 2007 || Mount Lemmon || Mount Lemmon Survey ||  || align=right data-sort-value="0.81" | 810 m || 
|-id=642 bgcolor=#d6d6d6
| 597642 ||  || — || September 15, 2007 || Mount Lemmon || Mount Lemmon Survey ||  || align=right | 2.3 km || 
|-id=643 bgcolor=#fefefe
| 597643 ||  || — || September 15, 2007 || Kitt Peak || Spacewatch ||  || align=right data-sort-value="0.56" | 560 m || 
|-id=644 bgcolor=#d6d6d6
| 597644 ||  || — || September 4, 2007 || Mount Lemmon || Mount Lemmon Survey ||  || align=right | 1.6 km || 
|-id=645 bgcolor=#d6d6d6
| 597645 ||  || — || September 12, 2007 || Mount Lemmon || Mount Lemmon Survey ||  || align=right | 2.1 km || 
|-id=646 bgcolor=#d6d6d6
| 597646 ||  || — || September 11, 2007 || Mount Lemmon || Mount Lemmon Survey ||  || align=right | 2.1 km || 
|-id=647 bgcolor=#E9E9E9
| 597647 ||  || — || September 10, 2007 || Mount Lemmon || Mount Lemmon Survey ||  || align=right | 1.7 km || 
|-id=648 bgcolor=#E9E9E9
| 597648 ||  || — || September 19, 2007 || Junk Bond || D. Healy ||  || align=right | 1.2 km || 
|-id=649 bgcolor=#E9E9E9
| 597649 ||  || — || September 10, 2007 || Kitt Peak || Spacewatch ||  || align=right | 2.1 km || 
|-id=650 bgcolor=#d6d6d6
| 597650 ||  || — || September 20, 2007 || Mount Lemmon || Mount Lemmon Survey ||  || align=right | 2.4 km || 
|-id=651 bgcolor=#E9E9E9
| 597651 ||  || — || September 26, 2007 || Mount Lemmon || Mount Lemmon Survey ||  || align=right | 1.2 km || 
|-id=652 bgcolor=#E9E9E9
| 597652 ||  || — || October 4, 2007 || Kitt Peak || Spacewatch ||  || align=right | 2.2 km || 
|-id=653 bgcolor=#E9E9E9
| 597653 ||  || — || January 17, 2004 || Palomar || NEAT ||  || align=right | 1.9 km || 
|-id=654 bgcolor=#E9E9E9
| 597654 ||  || — || October 4, 2007 || Kitt Peak || Spacewatch ||  || align=right | 1.9 km || 
|-id=655 bgcolor=#E9E9E9
| 597655 ||  || — || September 9, 2007 || Mount Lemmon || Mount Lemmon Survey ||  || align=right data-sort-value="0.64" | 640 m || 
|-id=656 bgcolor=#d6d6d6
| 597656 ||  || — || September 13, 2007 || Kitt Peak || Spacewatch ||  || align=right | 2.1 km || 
|-id=657 bgcolor=#E9E9E9
| 597657 ||  || — || October 7, 2007 || Kitt Peak || Spacewatch ||  || align=right | 3.4 km || 
|-id=658 bgcolor=#E9E9E9
| 597658 ||  || — || October 4, 2007 || Kitt Peak || Spacewatch ||  || align=right | 2.0 km || 
|-id=659 bgcolor=#fefefe
| 597659 ||  || — || October 4, 2007 || Kitt Peak || Spacewatch ||  || align=right data-sort-value="0.57" | 570 m || 
|-id=660 bgcolor=#fefefe
| 597660 ||  || — || September 14, 2007 || Anderson Mesa || LONEOS ||  || align=right data-sort-value="0.49" | 490 m || 
|-id=661 bgcolor=#FA8072
| 597661 ||  || — || October 13, 2007 || Socorro || LINEAR ||  || align=right data-sort-value="0.81" | 810 m || 
|-id=662 bgcolor=#E9E9E9
| 597662 ||  || — || October 14, 2007 || Altschwendt || W. Ries ||  || align=right | 1.6 km || 
|-id=663 bgcolor=#d6d6d6
| 597663 ||  || — || September 8, 2007 || Mount Lemmon || Mount Lemmon Survey ||  || align=right | 3.0 km || 
|-id=664 bgcolor=#E9E9E9
| 597664 ||  || — || September 18, 2007 || Kitt Peak || Spacewatch ||  || align=right | 1.3 km || 
|-id=665 bgcolor=#fefefe
| 597665 ||  || — || October 8, 2007 || Mount Lemmon || Mount Lemmon Survey ||  || align=right data-sort-value="0.75" | 750 m || 
|-id=666 bgcolor=#E9E9E9
| 597666 ||  || — || October 15, 2007 || Altschwendt || W. Ries ||  || align=right data-sort-value="0.70" | 700 m || 
|-id=667 bgcolor=#fefefe
| 597667 ||  || — || September 20, 2007 || Catalina || CSS ||  || align=right data-sort-value="0.62" | 620 m || 
|-id=668 bgcolor=#E9E9E9
| 597668 ||  || — || September 11, 2007 || Catalina || CSS ||  || align=right | 1.6 km || 
|-id=669 bgcolor=#E9E9E9
| 597669 ||  || — || October 8, 2007 || Crni Vrh || S. Matičič ||  || align=right | 2.0 km || 
|-id=670 bgcolor=#fefefe
| 597670 ||  || — || October 7, 2007 || Catalina || CSS ||  || align=right data-sort-value="0.68" | 680 m || 
|-id=671 bgcolor=#fefefe
| 597671 ||  || — || October 7, 2007 || Mount Lemmon || Mount Lemmon Survey ||  || align=right data-sort-value="0.68" | 680 m || 
|-id=672 bgcolor=#fefefe
| 597672 ||  || — || September 9, 2007 || Kitt Peak || Spacewatch ||  || align=right data-sort-value="0.51" | 510 m || 
|-id=673 bgcolor=#fefefe
| 597673 ||  || — || October 5, 2007 || Kitt Peak || Spacewatch ||  || align=right data-sort-value="0.71" | 710 m || 
|-id=674 bgcolor=#E9E9E9
| 597674 ||  || — || September 15, 2007 || Mount Lemmon || Mount Lemmon Survey ||  || align=right | 2.1 km || 
|-id=675 bgcolor=#E9E9E9
| 597675 ||  || — || October 7, 2007 || Mount Lemmon || Mount Lemmon Survey ||  || align=right | 1.4 km || 
|-id=676 bgcolor=#E9E9E9
| 597676 ||  || — || October 8, 2007 || Kitt Peak || Spacewatch ||  || align=right | 2.0 km || 
|-id=677 bgcolor=#d6d6d6
| 597677 ||  || — || October 9, 2007 || Mount Lemmon || Mount Lemmon Survey ||  || align=right | 2.4 km || 
|-id=678 bgcolor=#fefefe
| 597678 ||  || — || October 11, 2007 || Mount Lemmon || Mount Lemmon Survey ||  || align=right data-sort-value="0.58" | 580 m || 
|-id=679 bgcolor=#fefefe
| 597679 ||  || — || December 15, 2004 || Kitt Peak || Spacewatch ||  || align=right data-sort-value="0.75" | 750 m || 
|-id=680 bgcolor=#fefefe
| 597680 ||  || — || December 18, 2004 || Mount Lemmon || Mount Lemmon Survey ||  || align=right data-sort-value="0.58" | 580 m || 
|-id=681 bgcolor=#E9E9E9
| 597681 ||  || — || October 8, 2007 || Kitt Peak || Spacewatch ||  || align=right | 1.3 km || 
|-id=682 bgcolor=#E9E9E9
| 597682 ||  || — || April 2, 2005 || Kitt Peak || Spacewatch ||  || align=right | 2.1 km || 
|-id=683 bgcolor=#E9E9E9
| 597683 ||  || — || October 8, 2007 || Catalina || CSS ||  || align=right | 1.7 km || 
|-id=684 bgcolor=#fefefe
| 597684 ||  || — || October 9, 2007 || Anderson Mesa || LONEOS ||  || align=right data-sort-value="0.83" | 830 m || 
|-id=685 bgcolor=#fefefe
| 597685 ||  || — || October 10, 2007 || Kitt Peak || Spacewatch ||  || align=right data-sort-value="0.62" | 620 m || 
|-id=686 bgcolor=#fefefe
| 597686 ||  || — || October 11, 2007 || Kitt Peak || Spacewatch ||  || align=right data-sort-value="0.70" | 700 m || 
|-id=687 bgcolor=#E9E9E9
| 597687 ||  || — || October 8, 2007 || Mount Lemmon || Mount Lemmon Survey ||  || align=right data-sort-value="0.99" | 990 m || 
|-id=688 bgcolor=#E9E9E9
| 597688 ||  || — || September 14, 2007 || Catalina || CSS ||  || align=right | 3.2 km || 
|-id=689 bgcolor=#E9E9E9
| 597689 ||  || — || October 12, 2007 || Kitt Peak || Spacewatch ||  || align=right | 1.6 km || 
|-id=690 bgcolor=#d6d6d6
| 597690 ||  || — || October 4, 2007 || Kitt Peak || Spacewatch || BRA || align=right | 1.3 km || 
|-id=691 bgcolor=#E9E9E9
| 597691 ||  || — || October 12, 2007 || Kitt Peak || Spacewatch ||  || align=right | 1.7 km || 
|-id=692 bgcolor=#fefefe
| 597692 ||  || — || October 9, 2007 || Mount Lemmon || Mount Lemmon Survey ||  || align=right data-sort-value="0.46" | 460 m || 
|-id=693 bgcolor=#E9E9E9
| 597693 ||  || — || October 11, 2007 || Mount Lemmon || Mount Lemmon Survey ||  || align=right | 1.6 km || 
|-id=694 bgcolor=#E9E9E9
| 597694 ||  || — || October 12, 2007 || Kitt Peak || Spacewatch ||  || align=right | 1.7 km || 
|-id=695 bgcolor=#E9E9E9
| 597695 ||  || — || October 11, 2007 || Kitt Peak || Spacewatch ||  || align=right | 1.7 km || 
|-id=696 bgcolor=#fefefe
| 597696 ||  || — || September 10, 2007 || Mount Lemmon || Mount Lemmon Survey ||  || align=right data-sort-value="0.62" | 620 m || 
|-id=697 bgcolor=#fefefe
| 597697 ||  || — || October 9, 2007 || Mount Lemmon || Mount Lemmon Survey ||  || align=right data-sort-value="0.57" | 570 m || 
|-id=698 bgcolor=#fefefe
| 597698 ||  || — || October 10, 2007 || Mount Lemmon || Mount Lemmon Survey ||  || align=right data-sort-value="0.56" | 560 m || 
|-id=699 bgcolor=#E9E9E9
| 597699 ||  || — || September 18, 2007 || Kitt Peak || Spacewatch ||  || align=right | 1.7 km || 
|-id=700 bgcolor=#FA8072
| 597700 ||  || — || October 11, 2007 || Catalina || CSS ||  || align=right data-sort-value="0.65" | 650 m || 
|}

597701–597800 

|-bgcolor=#E9E9E9
| 597701 ||  || — || October 15, 2007 || Mount Lemmon || Mount Lemmon Survey ||  || align=right | 1.7 km || 
|-id=702 bgcolor=#d6d6d6
| 597702 ||  || — || October 15, 2007 || Mount Lemmon || Mount Lemmon Survey ||  || align=right | 2.1 km || 
|-id=703 bgcolor=#E9E9E9
| 597703 ||  || — || October 12, 2007 || Mount Lemmon || Mount Lemmon Survey ||  || align=right | 2.0 km || 
|-id=704 bgcolor=#E9E9E9
| 597704 ||  || — || September 12, 2007 || Mount Lemmon || Mount Lemmon Survey ||  || align=right | 1.3 km || 
|-id=705 bgcolor=#E9E9E9
| 597705 ||  || — || October 15, 2007 || Mount Lemmon || Mount Lemmon Survey ||  || align=right | 2.0 km || 
|-id=706 bgcolor=#E9E9E9
| 597706 ||  || — || October 8, 2007 || Mount Lemmon || Mount Lemmon Survey ||  || align=right | 1.2 km || 
|-id=707 bgcolor=#fefefe
| 597707 ||  || — || October 15, 2007 || Kitt Peak || Spacewatch ||  || align=right data-sort-value="0.57" | 570 m || 
|-id=708 bgcolor=#E9E9E9
| 597708 ||  || — || October 15, 2007 || Kitt Peak || Spacewatch ||  || align=right | 1.5 km || 
|-id=709 bgcolor=#E9E9E9
| 597709 ||  || — || October 11, 2007 || Kitt Peak || Spacewatch ||  || align=right | 2.5 km || 
|-id=710 bgcolor=#E9E9E9
| 597710 ||  || — || October 15, 2007 || Mount Lemmon || Mount Lemmon Survey ||  || align=right | 2.2 km || 
|-id=711 bgcolor=#E9E9E9
| 597711 ||  || — || October 15, 2007 || Mount Lemmon || Mount Lemmon Survey || HOF || align=right | 2.1 km || 
|-id=712 bgcolor=#E9E9E9
| 597712 ||  || — || October 14, 2007 || Kitt Peak || Spacewatch ||  || align=right | 1.7 km || 
|-id=713 bgcolor=#d6d6d6
| 597713 ||  || — || October 8, 2007 || Kitt Peak || Spacewatch ||  || align=right | 1.9 km || 
|-id=714 bgcolor=#E9E9E9
| 597714 ||  || — || October 10, 2007 || Kitt Peak || Spacewatch ||  || align=right | 1.7 km || 
|-id=715 bgcolor=#d6d6d6
| 597715 ||  || — || October 12, 2007 || Mount Lemmon || Mount Lemmon Survey ||  || align=right | 2.4 km || 
|-id=716 bgcolor=#E9E9E9
| 597716 ||  || — || September 10, 2007 || Mount Lemmon || Mount Lemmon Survey ||  || align=right | 1.4 km || 
|-id=717 bgcolor=#E9E9E9
| 597717 ||  || — || October 8, 2007 || Mount Lemmon || Mount Lemmon Survey ||  || align=right | 1.3 km || 
|-id=718 bgcolor=#d6d6d6
| 597718 ||  || — || October 10, 2007 || Catalina || CSS ||  || align=right | 2.4 km || 
|-id=719 bgcolor=#d6d6d6
| 597719 ||  || — || October 12, 2007 || Mount Lemmon || Mount Lemmon Survey ||  || align=right | 2.7 km || 
|-id=720 bgcolor=#E9E9E9
| 597720 ||  || — || October 15, 2007 || Kitt Peak || Spacewatch ||  || align=right | 2.0 km || 
|-id=721 bgcolor=#fefefe
| 597721 ||  || — || October 11, 2007 || Kitt Peak || Spacewatch ||  || align=right data-sort-value="0.57" | 570 m || 
|-id=722 bgcolor=#E9E9E9
| 597722 ||  || — || August 2, 2016 || Haleakala || Pan-STARRS ||  || align=right | 1.7 km || 
|-id=723 bgcolor=#fefefe
| 597723 ||  || — || October 12, 2007 || Kitt Peak || Spacewatch ||  || align=right data-sort-value="0.53" | 530 m || 
|-id=724 bgcolor=#E9E9E9
| 597724 ||  || — || October 15, 2007 || Kitt Peak || Spacewatch ||  || align=right | 1.6 km || 
|-id=725 bgcolor=#E9E9E9
| 597725 ||  || — || April 30, 2015 || Mount Lemmon || Mount Lemmon Survey ||  || align=right | 1.6 km || 
|-id=726 bgcolor=#fefefe
| 597726 ||  || — || April 10, 2013 || Haleakala || Pan-STARRS ||  || align=right data-sort-value="0.55" | 550 m || 
|-id=727 bgcolor=#E9E9E9
| 597727 ||  || — || April 5, 2014 || Haleakala || Pan-STARRS ||  || align=right | 2.0 km || 
|-id=728 bgcolor=#E9E9E9
| 597728 ||  || — || August 24, 2011 || Haleakala || Pan-STARRS ||  || align=right | 2.2 km || 
|-id=729 bgcolor=#E9E9E9
| 597729 ||  || — || October 10, 2007 || Kitt Peak || Spacewatch ||  || align=right | 2.3 km || 
|-id=730 bgcolor=#E9E9E9
| 597730 ||  || — || October 8, 2007 || Mount Lemmon || Mount Lemmon Survey ||  || align=right | 2.2 km || 
|-id=731 bgcolor=#fefefe
| 597731 ||  || — || October 12, 2007 || Catalina || CSS ||  || align=right data-sort-value="0.68" | 680 m || 
|-id=732 bgcolor=#d6d6d6
| 597732 ||  || — || October 10, 2007 || Mount Lemmon || Mount Lemmon Survey ||  || align=right | 1.9 km || 
|-id=733 bgcolor=#d6d6d6
| 597733 ||  || — || September 16, 2017 || Haleakala || Pan-STARRS ||  || align=right | 2.1 km || 
|-id=734 bgcolor=#fefefe
| 597734 ||  || — || September 6, 2012 || Haleakala || Pan-STARRS || H || align=right data-sort-value="0.55" | 550 m || 
|-id=735 bgcolor=#E9E9E9
| 597735 ||  || — || October 15, 2007 || Kitt Peak || Spacewatch ||  || align=right | 1.0 km || 
|-id=736 bgcolor=#E9E9E9
| 597736 ||  || — || October 12, 2007 || Mount Lemmon || Mount Lemmon Survey ||  || align=right | 1.8 km || 
|-id=737 bgcolor=#E9E9E9
| 597737 ||  || — || October 11, 2007 || Mount Lemmon || Mount Lemmon Survey ||  || align=right | 1.2 km || 
|-id=738 bgcolor=#E9E9E9
| 597738 ||  || — || September 15, 2007 || Catalina || CSS ||  || align=right | 2.1 km || 
|-id=739 bgcolor=#C2FFFF
| 597739 ||  || — || February 15, 2013 || Haleakala || Pan-STARRS || L4 || align=right | 7.6 km || 
|-id=740 bgcolor=#d6d6d6
| 597740 ||  || — || October 9, 2007 || Kitt Peak || Spacewatch ||  || align=right | 2.0 km || 
|-id=741 bgcolor=#E9E9E9
| 597741 ||  || — || January 1, 2009 || Kitt Peak || Spacewatch ||  || align=right | 1.5 km || 
|-id=742 bgcolor=#fefefe
| 597742 ||  || — || April 3, 2016 || Haleakala || Pan-STARRS ||  || align=right data-sort-value="0.47" | 470 m || 
|-id=743 bgcolor=#fefefe
| 597743 ||  || — || October 7, 2007 || Mount Lemmon || Mount Lemmon Survey || H || align=right data-sort-value="0.43" | 430 m || 
|-id=744 bgcolor=#E9E9E9
| 597744 ||  || — || October 9, 2007 || Kitt Peak || Spacewatch ||  || align=right | 1.8 km || 
|-id=745 bgcolor=#E9E9E9
| 597745 ||  || — || October 10, 2007 || Anderson Mesa || LONEOS ||  || align=right | 1.2 km || 
|-id=746 bgcolor=#E9E9E9
| 597746 ||  || — || October 12, 2007 || Kitt Peak || Spacewatch ||  || align=right data-sort-value="0.97" | 970 m || 
|-id=747 bgcolor=#fefefe
| 597747 ||  || — || October 9, 2007 || Mount Lemmon || Mount Lemmon Survey ||  || align=right data-sort-value="0.50" | 500 m || 
|-id=748 bgcolor=#E9E9E9
| 597748 ||  || — || October 8, 2007 || Mount Lemmon || Mount Lemmon Survey ||  || align=right | 1.3 km || 
|-id=749 bgcolor=#d6d6d6
| 597749 ||  || — || October 12, 2007 || Kitt Peak || Spacewatch ||  || align=right | 2.1 km || 
|-id=750 bgcolor=#E9E9E9
| 597750 ||  || — || October 9, 2007 || Mount Lemmon || Mount Lemmon Survey ||  || align=right | 1.4 km || 
|-id=751 bgcolor=#d6d6d6
| 597751 ||  || — || October 15, 2007 || Mount Lemmon || Mount Lemmon Survey ||  || align=right | 2.4 km || 
|-id=752 bgcolor=#E9E9E9
| 597752 ||  || — || October 16, 2007 || Catalina || CSS ||  || align=right | 1.1 km || 
|-id=753 bgcolor=#E9E9E9
| 597753 ||  || — || September 12, 2007 || Mount Lemmon || Mount Lemmon Survey ||  || align=right | 1.6 km || 
|-id=754 bgcolor=#E9E9E9
| 597754 ||  || — || October 19, 2007 || Mount Lemmon || Mount Lemmon Survey ||  || align=right | 1.7 km || 
|-id=755 bgcolor=#fefefe
| 597755 ||  || — || September 9, 2007 || Mount Lemmon || Mount Lemmon Survey ||  || align=right data-sort-value="0.54" | 540 m || 
|-id=756 bgcolor=#E9E9E9
| 597756 ||  || — || March 9, 2005 || Mount Lemmon || Mount Lemmon Survey ||  || align=right | 2.4 km || 
|-id=757 bgcolor=#E9E9E9
| 597757 ||  || — || October 11, 2007 || Kitt Peak || Spacewatch ||  || align=right | 1.1 km || 
|-id=758 bgcolor=#fefefe
| 597758 ||  || — || October 16, 2003 || Palomar || NEAT ||  || align=right data-sort-value="0.97" | 970 m || 
|-id=759 bgcolor=#d6d6d6
| 597759 ||  || — || October 8, 2007 || Bergisch Gladbach || W. Bickel ||  || align=right | 2.7 km || 
|-id=760 bgcolor=#d6d6d6
| 597760 ||  || — || October 30, 2007 || Mount Lemmon || Mount Lemmon Survey ||  || align=right | 1.4 km || 
|-id=761 bgcolor=#E9E9E9
| 597761 ||  || — || May 30, 2006 || Mount Lemmon || Mount Lemmon Survey ||  || align=right | 1.8 km || 
|-id=762 bgcolor=#FA8072
| 597762 ||  || — || October 17, 2007 || Catalina || CSS ||  || align=right | 1.6 km || 
|-id=763 bgcolor=#E9E9E9
| 597763 ||  || — || October 12, 2007 || Kitt Peak || Spacewatch ||  || align=right | 1.6 km || 
|-id=764 bgcolor=#fefefe
| 597764 ||  || — || October 31, 2007 || Mount Lemmon || Mount Lemmon Survey ||  || align=right data-sort-value="0.58" | 580 m || 
|-id=765 bgcolor=#E9E9E9
| 597765 ||  || — || October 11, 2007 || Kitt Peak || Spacewatch ||  || align=right | 1.7 km || 
|-id=766 bgcolor=#d6d6d6
| 597766 ||  || — || October 30, 2007 || Kitt Peak || Spacewatch ||  || align=right | 1.9 km || 
|-id=767 bgcolor=#fefefe
| 597767 ||  || — || October 8, 2007 || Kitt Peak || Spacewatch ||  || align=right data-sort-value="0.57" | 570 m || 
|-id=768 bgcolor=#E9E9E9
| 597768 ||  || — || October 30, 2007 || Mount Lemmon || Mount Lemmon Survey ||  || align=right | 1.9 km || 
|-id=769 bgcolor=#d6d6d6
| 597769 ||  || — || October 30, 2007 || Mount Lemmon || Mount Lemmon Survey ||  || align=right | 1.9 km || 
|-id=770 bgcolor=#fefefe
| 597770 ||  || — || October 31, 2007 || Mount Lemmon || Mount Lemmon Survey ||  || align=right data-sort-value="0.54" | 540 m || 
|-id=771 bgcolor=#d6d6d6
| 597771 ||  || — || October 31, 2007 || Mount Lemmon || Mount Lemmon Survey ||  || align=right | 2.3 km || 
|-id=772 bgcolor=#E9E9E9
| 597772 ||  || — || October 31, 2007 || Mount Lemmon || Mount Lemmon Survey ||  || align=right | 1.8 km || 
|-id=773 bgcolor=#d6d6d6
| 597773 ||  || — || October 12, 2007 || Kitt Peak || Spacewatch ||  || align=right | 1.8 km || 
|-id=774 bgcolor=#E9E9E9
| 597774 ||  || — || October 4, 2007 || Kitt Peak || Spacewatch ||  || align=right | 1.9 km || 
|-id=775 bgcolor=#E9E9E9
| 597775 ||  || — || October 8, 2016 || Haleakala || Pan-STARRS ||  || align=right | 1.8 km || 
|-id=776 bgcolor=#fefefe
| 597776 ||  || — || September 30, 2014 || Kitt Peak || Spacewatch ||  || align=right data-sort-value="0.59" | 590 m || 
|-id=777 bgcolor=#fefefe
| 597777 ||  || — || March 26, 2009 || Kitt Peak || Spacewatch ||  || align=right data-sort-value="0.57" | 570 m || 
|-id=778 bgcolor=#fefefe
| 597778 ||  || — || October 30, 2007 || Mount Lemmon || Mount Lemmon Survey ||  || align=right data-sort-value="0.51" | 510 m || 
|-id=779 bgcolor=#E9E9E9
| 597779 ||  || — || February 18, 2010 || Mount Lemmon || Mount Lemmon Survey ||  || align=right | 1.8 km || 
|-id=780 bgcolor=#d6d6d6
| 597780 ||  || — || October 16, 2007 || Kitt Peak || Spacewatch ||  || align=right | 2.0 km || 
|-id=781 bgcolor=#E9E9E9
| 597781 ||  || — || October 20, 2007 || Mount Lemmon || Mount Lemmon Survey ||  || align=right | 1.7 km || 
|-id=782 bgcolor=#E9E9E9
| 597782 ||  || — || October 17, 2007 || Mount Lemmon || Mount Lemmon Survey ||  || align=right | 1.1 km || 
|-id=783 bgcolor=#E9E9E9
| 597783 ||  || — || October 18, 2007 || Mount Lemmon || Mount Lemmon Survey ||  || align=right | 2.0 km || 
|-id=784 bgcolor=#E9E9E9
| 597784 ||  || — || September 15, 2007 || Mount Lemmon || Mount Lemmon Survey ||  || align=right | 1.4 km || 
|-id=785 bgcolor=#E9E9E9
| 597785 ||  || — || October 17, 2007 || Mount Lemmon || Mount Lemmon Survey ||  || align=right | 1.2 km || 
|-id=786 bgcolor=#d6d6d6
| 597786 ||  || — || October 18, 2007 || Mount Lemmon || Mount Lemmon Survey ||  || align=right | 2.6 km || 
|-id=787 bgcolor=#d6d6d6
| 597787 ||  || — || October 16, 2007 || Mount Lemmon || Mount Lemmon Survey ||  || align=right | 2.1 km || 
|-id=788 bgcolor=#fefefe
| 597788 ||  || — || November 1, 2007 || Mount Lemmon || Mount Lemmon Survey ||  || align=right data-sort-value="0.62" | 620 m || 
|-id=789 bgcolor=#E9E9E9
| 597789 ||  || — || October 10, 2007 || Kitt Peak || Spacewatch ||  || align=right | 1.5 km || 
|-id=790 bgcolor=#fefefe
| 597790 ||  || — || February 13, 2002 || Kitt Peak || Spacewatch ||  || align=right data-sort-value="0.67" | 670 m || 
|-id=791 bgcolor=#E9E9E9
| 597791 ||  || — || October 9, 2007 || Kitt Peak || Spacewatch ||  || align=right | 1.8 km || 
|-id=792 bgcolor=#fefefe
| 597792 ||  || — || October 10, 2007 || Kitt Peak || Spacewatch ||  || align=right data-sort-value="0.61" | 610 m || 
|-id=793 bgcolor=#E9E9E9
| 597793 ||  || — || October 10, 2007 || Mount Lemmon || Mount Lemmon Survey ||  || align=right | 1.7 km || 
|-id=794 bgcolor=#E9E9E9
| 597794 ||  || — || September 18, 2007 || Mount Lemmon || Mount Lemmon Survey || DOR || align=right | 1.5 km || 
|-id=795 bgcolor=#E9E9E9
| 597795 ||  || — || October 7, 2007 || Mount Lemmon || Mount Lemmon Survey ||  || align=right | 1.8 km || 
|-id=796 bgcolor=#E9E9E9
| 597796 ||  || — || November 4, 2007 || Kitt Peak || Spacewatch ||  || align=right | 1.7 km || 
|-id=797 bgcolor=#E9E9E9
| 597797 ||  || — || September 25, 2007 || Mount Lemmon || Mount Lemmon Survey ||  || align=right data-sort-value="0.87" | 870 m || 
|-id=798 bgcolor=#d6d6d6
| 597798 ||  || — || October 9, 2007 || Kitt Peak || Spacewatch ||  || align=right | 2.8 km || 
|-id=799 bgcolor=#fefefe
| 597799 ||  || — || November 7, 2007 || Socorro || LINEAR || H || align=right data-sort-value="0.45" | 450 m || 
|-id=800 bgcolor=#FA8072
| 597800 ||  || — || October 24, 2007 || Mount Lemmon || Mount Lemmon Survey ||  || align=right data-sort-value="0.69" | 690 m || 
|}

597801–597900 

|-bgcolor=#d6d6d6
| 597801 ||  || — || November 2, 2007 || Kitt Peak || Spacewatch ||  || align=right | 3.5 km || 
|-id=802 bgcolor=#fefefe
| 597802 ||  || — || November 3, 2007 || Kitt Peak || Spacewatch ||  || align=right data-sort-value="0.56" | 560 m || 
|-id=803 bgcolor=#E9E9E9
| 597803 ||  || — || November 3, 2007 || Kitt Peak || Spacewatch ||  || align=right | 1.8 km || 
|-id=804 bgcolor=#d6d6d6
| 597804 ||  || — || September 14, 2007 || Mount Lemmon || Mount Lemmon Survey ||  || align=right | 2.7 km || 
|-id=805 bgcolor=#d6d6d6
| 597805 ||  || — || January 3, 2003 || Kitt Peak || Spacewatch ||  || align=right | 2.0 km || 
|-id=806 bgcolor=#d6d6d6
| 597806 ||  || — || November 5, 2007 || Mount Lemmon || Mount Lemmon Survey ||  || align=right | 1.8 km || 
|-id=807 bgcolor=#fefefe
| 597807 ||  || — || November 1, 2007 || Mount Lemmon || Mount Lemmon Survey ||  || align=right data-sort-value="0.61" | 610 m || 
|-id=808 bgcolor=#E9E9E9
| 597808 ||  || — || November 2, 2007 || Mount Lemmon || Mount Lemmon Survey ||  || align=right | 1.9 km || 
|-id=809 bgcolor=#fefefe
| 597809 ||  || — || October 10, 2007 || Kitt Peak || Spacewatch ||  || align=right data-sort-value="0.55" | 550 m || 
|-id=810 bgcolor=#E9E9E9
| 597810 ||  || — || October 8, 2007 || Mount Lemmon || Mount Lemmon Survey ||  || align=right | 1.6 km || 
|-id=811 bgcolor=#E9E9E9
| 597811 ||  || — || October 4, 2007 || Kitt Peak || Spacewatch ||  || align=right | 1.3 km || 
|-id=812 bgcolor=#d6d6d6
| 597812 ||  || — || October 16, 2007 || Mount Lemmon || Mount Lemmon Survey ||  || align=right | 2.3 km || 
|-id=813 bgcolor=#E9E9E9
| 597813 ||  || — || November 3, 2007 || Kitt Peak || Spacewatch ||  || align=right | 2.9 km || 
|-id=814 bgcolor=#d6d6d6
| 597814 ||  || — || October 15, 2007 || Kitt Peak || Spacewatch ||  || align=right | 2.4 km || 
|-id=815 bgcolor=#fefefe
| 597815 ||  || — || November 4, 2007 || Mount Lemmon || Mount Lemmon Survey ||  || align=right data-sort-value="0.80" | 800 m || 
|-id=816 bgcolor=#fefefe
| 597816 ||  || — || November 4, 2007 || Mount Lemmon || Mount Lemmon Survey ||  || align=right data-sort-value="0.49" | 490 m || 
|-id=817 bgcolor=#d6d6d6
| 597817 ||  || — || November 4, 2007 || Kitt Peak || Spacewatch ||  || align=right | 3.2 km || 
|-id=818 bgcolor=#fefefe
| 597818 ||  || — || October 20, 2007 || Mount Lemmon || Mount Lemmon Survey ||  || align=right data-sort-value="0.70" | 700 m || 
|-id=819 bgcolor=#E9E9E9
| 597819 ||  || — || November 5, 2007 || Kitt Peak || Spacewatch ||  || align=right | 2.6 km || 
|-id=820 bgcolor=#fefefe
| 597820 ||  || — || November 5, 2007 || Kitt Peak || Spacewatch ||  || align=right data-sort-value="0.67" | 670 m || 
|-id=821 bgcolor=#fefefe
| 597821 ||  || — || November 7, 2007 || Kitt Peak || Spacewatch ||  || align=right data-sort-value="0.64" | 640 m || 
|-id=822 bgcolor=#d6d6d6
| 597822 ||  || — || November 4, 2007 || Mount Lemmon || Mount Lemmon Survey ||  || align=right | 2.2 km || 
|-id=823 bgcolor=#E9E9E9
| 597823 ||  || — || October 12, 2007 || Kitt Peak || Spacewatch ||  || align=right | 1.7 km || 
|-id=824 bgcolor=#fefefe
| 597824 ||  || — || October 8, 2007 || Mount Lemmon || Mount Lemmon Survey ||  || align=right data-sort-value="0.70" | 700 m || 
|-id=825 bgcolor=#fefefe
| 597825 ||  || — || November 7, 2007 || Mount Lemmon || Mount Lemmon Survey ||  || align=right data-sort-value="0.64" | 640 m || 
|-id=826 bgcolor=#E9E9E9
| 597826 ||  || — || October 30, 2007 || Kitt Peak || Spacewatch ||  || align=right | 1.7 km || 
|-id=827 bgcolor=#fefefe
| 597827 ||  || — || January 13, 2005 || Kitt Peak || Spacewatch ||  || align=right data-sort-value="0.73" | 730 m || 
|-id=828 bgcolor=#fefefe
| 597828 ||  || — || November 15, 2007 || Catalina || CSS || H || align=right data-sort-value="0.63" | 630 m || 
|-id=829 bgcolor=#fefefe
| 597829 ||  || — || October 23, 2007 || Kitt Peak || Spacewatch ||  || align=right data-sort-value="0.64" | 640 m || 
|-id=830 bgcolor=#fefefe
| 597830 ||  || — || November 9, 2007 || Mount Lemmon || Mount Lemmon Survey ||  || align=right data-sort-value="0.54" | 540 m || 
|-id=831 bgcolor=#fefefe
| 597831 ||  || — || November 9, 2007 || Mount Lemmon || Mount Lemmon Survey ||  || align=right data-sort-value="0.64" | 640 m || 
|-id=832 bgcolor=#E9E9E9
| 597832 ||  || — || November 11, 2007 || Mount Lemmon || Mount Lemmon Survey ||  || align=right | 1.7 km || 
|-id=833 bgcolor=#E9E9E9
| 597833 ||  || — || December 21, 2003 || Kitt Peak || Spacewatch ||  || align=right | 2.0 km || 
|-id=834 bgcolor=#E9E9E9
| 597834 ||  || — || November 9, 2007 || Kitt Peak || Spacewatch ||  || align=right | 2.3 km || 
|-id=835 bgcolor=#E9E9E9
| 597835 ||  || — || November 9, 2007 || Kitt Peak || Spacewatch ||  || align=right | 1.2 km || 
|-id=836 bgcolor=#E9E9E9
| 597836 ||  || — || November 1, 2007 || Kitt Peak || Spacewatch ||  || align=right | 2.2 km || 
|-id=837 bgcolor=#d6d6d6
| 597837 ||  || — || November 9, 2007 || Eskridge || G. Hug ||  || align=right | 2.6 km || 
|-id=838 bgcolor=#fefefe
| 597838 ||  || — || January 16, 2005 || Kitt Peak || Spacewatch ||  || align=right data-sort-value="0.77" | 770 m || 
|-id=839 bgcolor=#E9E9E9
| 597839 ||  || — || November 14, 2007 || Mount Lemmon || Mount Lemmon Survey ||  || align=right | 1.5 km || 
|-id=840 bgcolor=#fefefe
| 597840 ||  || — || September 23, 2017 || Haleakala || Pan-STARRS ||  || align=right data-sort-value="0.43" | 430 m || 
|-id=841 bgcolor=#E9E9E9
| 597841 ||  || — || November 13, 2007 || Mount Lemmon || Mount Lemmon Survey ||  || align=right | 1.2 km || 
|-id=842 bgcolor=#fefefe
| 597842 ||  || — || August 25, 2003 || Palomar || NEAT ||  || align=right data-sort-value="0.76" | 760 m || 
|-id=843 bgcolor=#E9E9E9
| 597843 ||  || — || November 13, 2007 || Mount Lemmon || Mount Lemmon Survey ||  || align=right | 1.6 km || 
|-id=844 bgcolor=#fefefe
| 597844 ||  || — || September 10, 2007 || Mount Lemmon || Mount Lemmon Survey ||  || align=right data-sort-value="0.55" | 550 m || 
|-id=845 bgcolor=#E9E9E9
| 597845 ||  || — || November 14, 2007 || Kitt Peak || Spacewatch ||  || align=right | 1.8 km || 
|-id=846 bgcolor=#E9E9E9
| 597846 ||  || — || October 15, 2007 || Mount Lemmon || Mount Lemmon Survey ||  || align=right | 1.9 km || 
|-id=847 bgcolor=#fefefe
| 597847 ||  || — || October 15, 2007 || Mount Lemmon || Mount Lemmon Survey ||  || align=right data-sort-value="0.67" | 670 m || 
|-id=848 bgcolor=#fefefe
| 597848 ||  || — || November 2, 2007 || Mount Lemmon || Mount Lemmon Survey || H || align=right data-sort-value="0.48" | 480 m || 
|-id=849 bgcolor=#E9E9E9
| 597849 ||  || — || November 13, 2007 || Mount Lemmon || Mount Lemmon Survey ||  || align=right | 2.2 km || 
|-id=850 bgcolor=#E9E9E9
| 597850 ||  || — || November 14, 2007 || Kitt Peak || Spacewatch ||  || align=right | 1.3 km || 
|-id=851 bgcolor=#d6d6d6
| 597851 ||  || — || November 13, 2007 || Mount Lemmon || Mount Lemmon Survey ||  || align=right | 2.5 km || 
|-id=852 bgcolor=#d6d6d6
| 597852 ||  || — || November 3, 2007 || Kitt Peak || Spacewatch ||  || align=right | 2.5 km || 
|-id=853 bgcolor=#fefefe
| 597853 ||  || — || November 4, 2007 || Catalina || CSS || H || align=right data-sort-value="0.50" | 500 m || 
|-id=854 bgcolor=#E9E9E9
| 597854 ||  || — || November 9, 2007 || Kitt Peak || Spacewatch ||  || align=right | 2.2 km || 
|-id=855 bgcolor=#d6d6d6
| 597855 ||  || — || October 16, 2007 || Catalina || CSS ||  || align=right | 3.6 km || 
|-id=856 bgcolor=#E9E9E9
| 597856 ||  || — || November 5, 2007 || Kitt Peak || Spacewatch ||  || align=right | 2.1 km || 
|-id=857 bgcolor=#d6d6d6
| 597857 ||  || — || November 3, 2007 || Kitt Peak || Spacewatch ||  || align=right | 1.7 km || 
|-id=858 bgcolor=#fefefe
| 597858 ||  || — || November 11, 2007 || Mount Lemmon || Mount Lemmon Survey ||  || align=right data-sort-value="0.79" | 790 m || 
|-id=859 bgcolor=#d6d6d6
| 597859 ||  || — || November 7, 2007 || Mount Lemmon || Mount Lemmon Survey ||  || align=right | 2.1 km || 
|-id=860 bgcolor=#E9E9E9
| 597860 ||  || — || November 11, 2007 || Catalina || CSS ||  || align=right | 1.9 km || 
|-id=861 bgcolor=#E9E9E9
| 597861 ||  || — || December 23, 2012 || Haleakala || Pan-STARRS ||  || align=right | 1.9 km || 
|-id=862 bgcolor=#fefefe
| 597862 ||  || — || November 7, 2007 || Kitt Peak || Spacewatch ||  || align=right data-sort-value="0.80" | 800 m || 
|-id=863 bgcolor=#E9E9E9
| 597863 ||  || — || April 30, 2014 || Haleakala || Pan-STARRS ||  || align=right | 1.9 km || 
|-id=864 bgcolor=#fefefe
| 597864 ||  || — || November 5, 2007 || Kitt Peak || Spacewatch ||  || align=right data-sort-value="0.54" | 540 m || 
|-id=865 bgcolor=#E9E9E9
| 597865 ||  || — || November 4, 2016 || Haleakala || Pan-STARRS ||  || align=right | 1.4 km || 
|-id=866 bgcolor=#fefefe
| 597866 ||  || — || October 3, 2014 || Mount Lemmon || Mount Lemmon Survey ||  || align=right data-sort-value="0.58" | 580 m || 
|-id=867 bgcolor=#E9E9E9
| 597867 ||  || — || June 22, 2015 || Haleakala || Pan-STARRS ||  || align=right | 1.6 km || 
|-id=868 bgcolor=#d6d6d6
| 597868 ||  || — || November 2, 2007 || Kitt Peak || Spacewatch ||  || align=right | 2.2 km || 
|-id=869 bgcolor=#d6d6d6
| 597869 ||  || — || November 2, 2007 || Kitt Peak || Spacewatch ||  || align=right | 2.6 km || 
|-id=870 bgcolor=#E9E9E9
| 597870 ||  || — || February 4, 2009 || Mount Lemmon || Mount Lemmon Survey ||  || align=right | 1.8 km || 
|-id=871 bgcolor=#fefefe
| 597871 ||  || — || November 8, 2007 || Kitt Peak || Spacewatch ||  || align=right data-sort-value="0.50" | 500 m || 
|-id=872 bgcolor=#E9E9E9
| 597872 ||  || — || February 27, 2014 || Haleakala || Pan-STARRS ||  || align=right | 1.8 km || 
|-id=873 bgcolor=#E9E9E9
| 597873 ||  || — || November 12, 2012 || Mount Lemmon || Mount Lemmon Survey ||  || align=right | 1.7 km || 
|-id=874 bgcolor=#d6d6d6
| 597874 ||  || — || November 15, 2012 || Catalina || CSS ||  || align=right | 4.0 km || 
|-id=875 bgcolor=#E9E9E9
| 597875 ||  || — || October 9, 2016 || Haleakala || Pan-STARRS ||  || align=right | 1.6 km || 
|-id=876 bgcolor=#E9E9E9
| 597876 ||  || — || October 12, 2007 || Mount Lemmon || Mount Lemmon Survey ||  || align=right | 1.6 km || 
|-id=877 bgcolor=#fefefe
| 597877 ||  || — || March 3, 2009 || Mount Lemmon || Mount Lemmon Survey ||  || align=right data-sort-value="0.61" | 610 m || 
|-id=878 bgcolor=#E9E9E9
| 597878 ||  || — || February 5, 2009 || Kitt Peak || Spacewatch ||  || align=right | 1.6 km || 
|-id=879 bgcolor=#d6d6d6
| 597879 ||  || — || August 27, 2016 || Haleakala || Pan-STARRS ||  || align=right | 1.6 km || 
|-id=880 bgcolor=#E9E9E9
| 597880 ||  || — || November 5, 2007 || Mount Lemmon || Mount Lemmon Survey ||  || align=right | 1.7 km || 
|-id=881 bgcolor=#fefefe
| 597881 ||  || — || November 3, 2007 || Kitt Peak || Spacewatch ||  || align=right data-sort-value="0.64" | 640 m || 
|-id=882 bgcolor=#E9E9E9
| 597882 ||  || — || November 2, 2007 || Mount Lemmon || Mount Lemmon Survey ||  || align=right | 1.7 km || 
|-id=883 bgcolor=#fefefe
| 597883 ||  || — || November 2, 2007 || Kitt Peak || Spacewatch ||  || align=right data-sort-value="0.75" | 750 m || 
|-id=884 bgcolor=#E9E9E9
| 597884 ||  || — || November 2, 2007 || Mount Lemmon || Mount Lemmon Survey ||  || align=right | 1.6 km || 
|-id=885 bgcolor=#E9E9E9
| 597885 ||  || — || November 4, 2007 || Mount Lemmon || Mount Lemmon Survey ||  || align=right | 1.7 km || 
|-id=886 bgcolor=#fefefe
| 597886 ||  || — || November 3, 2007 || Kitt Peak || Spacewatch ||  || align=right data-sort-value="0.52" | 520 m || 
|-id=887 bgcolor=#d6d6d6
| 597887 ||  || — || November 9, 2007 || Kitt Peak || Spacewatch ||  || align=right | 2.7 km || 
|-id=888 bgcolor=#d6d6d6
| 597888 ||  || — || November 3, 2007 || Mount Lemmon || Mount Lemmon Survey ||  || align=right | 2.7 km || 
|-id=889 bgcolor=#E9E9E9
| 597889 ||  || — || November 2, 2007 || Catalina || CSS ||  || align=right | 1.4 km || 
|-id=890 bgcolor=#fefefe
| 597890 ||  || — || December 19, 2004 || Mount Lemmon || Mount Lemmon Survey ||  || align=right data-sort-value="0.66" | 660 m || 
|-id=891 bgcolor=#E9E9E9
| 597891 ||  || — || November 18, 2007 || Mount Lemmon || Mount Lemmon Survey ||  || align=right | 2.0 km || 
|-id=892 bgcolor=#E9E9E9
| 597892 ||  || — || November 1, 2007 || Kitt Peak || Spacewatch ||  || align=right | 2.4 km || 
|-id=893 bgcolor=#fefefe
| 597893 ||  || — || September 10, 2007 || Mount Lemmon || Mount Lemmon Survey ||  || align=right data-sort-value="0.78" | 780 m || 
|-id=894 bgcolor=#fefefe
| 597894 ||  || — || November 19, 2007 || Kitt Peak || Spacewatch || H || align=right data-sort-value="0.49" | 490 m || 
|-id=895 bgcolor=#fefefe
| 597895 ||  || — || November 2, 2007 || Kitt Peak || Spacewatch ||  || align=right data-sort-value="0.68" | 680 m || 
|-id=896 bgcolor=#fefefe
| 597896 ||  || — || November 19, 2007 || Mount Lemmon || Mount Lemmon Survey ||  || align=right data-sort-value="0.48" | 480 m || 
|-id=897 bgcolor=#fefefe
| 597897 ||  || — || November 19, 2007 || Mount Lemmon || Mount Lemmon Survey ||  || align=right data-sort-value="0.85" | 850 m || 
|-id=898 bgcolor=#fefefe
| 597898 ||  || — || November 19, 2007 || Mount Lemmon || Mount Lemmon Survey ||  || align=right data-sort-value="0.72" | 720 m || 
|-id=899 bgcolor=#E9E9E9
| 597899 ||  || — || November 2, 2007 || Mount Lemmon || Mount Lemmon Survey ||  || align=right | 1.7 km || 
|-id=900 bgcolor=#E9E9E9
| 597900 ||  || — || November 18, 2007 || Mount Lemmon || Mount Lemmon Survey ||  || align=right | 1.7 km || 
|}

597901–598000 

|-bgcolor=#d6d6d6
| 597901 ||  || — || November 8, 2007 || Kitt Peak || Spacewatch ||  || align=right | 2.9 km || 
|-id=902 bgcolor=#d6d6d6
| 597902 ||  || — || October 9, 2007 || Kitt Peak || Spacewatch ||  || align=right | 2.4 km || 
|-id=903 bgcolor=#E9E9E9
| 597903 ||  || — || January 30, 2004 || Kitt Peak || Spacewatch ||  || align=right | 1.7 km || 
|-id=904 bgcolor=#E9E9E9
| 597904 ||  || — || November 3, 2007 || Kitt Peak || Spacewatch ||  || align=right | 1.2 km || 
|-id=905 bgcolor=#d6d6d6
| 597905 ||  || — || November 18, 2007 || Mount Lemmon || Mount Lemmon Survey ||  || align=right | 2.2 km || 
|-id=906 bgcolor=#d6d6d6
| 597906 ||  || — || November 8, 2007 || Kitt Peak || Spacewatch ||  || align=right | 1.6 km || 
|-id=907 bgcolor=#E9E9E9
| 597907 ||  || — || November 20, 2007 || Mount Lemmon || Mount Lemmon Survey ||  || align=right | 1.8 km || 
|-id=908 bgcolor=#E9E9E9
| 597908 ||  || — || March 23, 2014 || Mount Lemmon || Mount Lemmon Survey ||  || align=right | 1.9 km || 
|-id=909 bgcolor=#E9E9E9
| 597909 ||  || — || September 27, 2016 || Haleakala || Pan-STARRS ||  || align=right | 1.8 km || 
|-id=910 bgcolor=#E9E9E9
| 597910 ||  || — || February 3, 2009 || Kitt Peak || Spacewatch ||  || align=right | 2.0 km || 
|-id=911 bgcolor=#d6d6d6
| 597911 ||  || — || November 17, 2007 || Kitt Peak || Spacewatch ||  || align=right | 1.9 km || 
|-id=912 bgcolor=#E9E9E9
| 597912 ||  || — || November 15, 2007 || Catalina || CSS ||  || align=right | 2.3 km || 
|-id=913 bgcolor=#d6d6d6
| 597913 ||  || — || October 14, 2007 || Mount Lemmon || Mount Lemmon Survey ||  || align=right | 2.1 km || 
|-id=914 bgcolor=#E9E9E9
| 597914 ||  || — || November 15, 2007 || Mount Lemmon || Mount Lemmon Survey ||  || align=right | 1.2 km || 
|-id=915 bgcolor=#E9E9E9
| 597915 ||  || — || November 1, 2007 || Kitt Peak || Spacewatch || ADE || align=right | 1.5 km || 
|-id=916 bgcolor=#E9E9E9
| 597916 ||  || — || December 15, 2007 || Catalina || CSS ||  || align=right | 2.2 km || 
|-id=917 bgcolor=#fefefe
| 597917 ||  || — || December 5, 2007 || Kitt Peak || Spacewatch ||  || align=right data-sort-value="0.74" | 740 m || 
|-id=918 bgcolor=#d6d6d6
| 597918 ||  || — || November 4, 2007 || Kitt Peak || Spacewatch ||  || align=right | 2.4 km || 
|-id=919 bgcolor=#d6d6d6
| 597919 ||  || — || May 24, 2015 || Haleakala || Pan-STARRS ||  || align=right | 2.3 km || 
|-id=920 bgcolor=#d6d6d6
| 597920 ||  || — || December 4, 2007 || Kitt Peak || Spacewatch ||  || align=right | 1.9 km || 
|-id=921 bgcolor=#E9E9E9
| 597921 ||  || — || April 7, 2014 || Mount Lemmon || Mount Lemmon Survey ||  || align=right | 2.0 km || 
|-id=922 bgcolor=#fefefe
| 597922 ||  || — || December 5, 2007 || Mount Lemmon || Mount Lemmon Survey ||  || align=right data-sort-value="0.69" | 690 m || 
|-id=923 bgcolor=#E9E9E9
| 597923 ||  || — || October 26, 2011 || Haleakala || Pan-STARRS ||  || align=right data-sort-value="0.82" | 820 m || 
|-id=924 bgcolor=#d6d6d6
| 597924 ||  || — || September 26, 2011 || Mount Lemmon || Mount Lemmon Survey ||  || align=right | 1.7 km || 
|-id=925 bgcolor=#E9E9E9
| 597925 ||  || — || October 2, 2016 || Kitt Peak || Spacewatch ||  || align=right | 1.7 km || 
|-id=926 bgcolor=#E9E9E9
| 597926 ||  || — || December 4, 2007 || Kitt Peak || Spacewatch ||  || align=right | 1.4 km || 
|-id=927 bgcolor=#d6d6d6
| 597927 ||  || — || December 4, 2007 || Mount Lemmon || Mount Lemmon Survey ||  || align=right | 3.0 km || 
|-id=928 bgcolor=#fefefe
| 597928 ||  || — || December 4, 2007 || Kitt Peak || Spacewatch ||  || align=right data-sort-value="0.66" | 660 m || 
|-id=929 bgcolor=#E9E9E9
| 597929 ||  || — || December 3, 2007 || Kitt Peak || Spacewatch ||  || align=right | 1.7 km || 
|-id=930 bgcolor=#d6d6d6
| 597930 ||  || — || December 4, 2007 || Mount Lemmon || Mount Lemmon Survey ||  || align=right | 3.2 km || 
|-id=931 bgcolor=#fefefe
| 597931 ||  || — || December 16, 2007 || Uccle || P. De Cat || H || align=right data-sort-value="0.89" | 890 m || 
|-id=932 bgcolor=#fefefe
| 597932 ||  || — || December 16, 2007 || Lulin || LUSS ||  || align=right data-sort-value="0.73" | 730 m || 
|-id=933 bgcolor=#d6d6d6
| 597933 ||  || — || December 17, 2007 || Mount Lemmon || Mount Lemmon Survey ||  || align=right | 2.6 km || 
|-id=934 bgcolor=#d6d6d6
| 597934 ||  || — || November 14, 2007 || Kitt Peak || Spacewatch ||  || align=right | 2.1 km || 
|-id=935 bgcolor=#E9E9E9
| 597935 ||  || — || December 16, 2007 || Kitt Peak || Spacewatch ||  || align=right | 1.3 km || 
|-id=936 bgcolor=#d6d6d6
| 597936 ||  || — || December 16, 2007 || Kitt Peak || Spacewatch ||  || align=right | 2.9 km || 
|-id=937 bgcolor=#d6d6d6
| 597937 ||  || — || November 2, 2007 || Mount Lemmon || Mount Lemmon Survey ||  || align=right | 2.9 km || 
|-id=938 bgcolor=#d6d6d6
| 597938 ||  || — || September 28, 2006 || Kitt Peak || Spacewatch ||  || align=right | 2.5 km || 
|-id=939 bgcolor=#d6d6d6
| 597939 ||  || — || October 19, 2007 || Mount Lemmon || Mount Lemmon Survey ||  || align=right | 2.5 km || 
|-id=940 bgcolor=#d6d6d6
| 597940 ||  || — || December 19, 2007 || Kitt Peak || Spacewatch ||  || align=right | 2.5 km || 
|-id=941 bgcolor=#fefefe
| 597941 ||  || — || July 29, 2001 || Palomar || NEAT || H || align=right data-sort-value="0.90" | 900 m || 
|-id=942 bgcolor=#fefefe
| 597942 ||  || — || December 5, 2007 || Kitt Peak || Spacewatch ||  || align=right data-sort-value="0.94" | 940 m || 
|-id=943 bgcolor=#E9E9E9
| 597943 ||  || — || December 30, 2007 || Mount Lemmon || Mount Lemmon Survey || ADE || align=right | 1.7 km || 
|-id=944 bgcolor=#E9E9E9
| 597944 ||  || — || December 28, 2007 || Kitt Peak || Spacewatch ||  || align=right | 1.4 km || 
|-id=945 bgcolor=#fefefe
| 597945 ||  || — || December 28, 2007 || Kitt Peak || Spacewatch ||  || align=right data-sort-value="0.83" | 830 m || 
|-id=946 bgcolor=#fefefe
| 597946 ||  || — || September 30, 2010 || Mount Lemmon || Mount Lemmon Survey ||  || align=right data-sort-value="0.59" | 590 m || 
|-id=947 bgcolor=#d6d6d6
| 597947 ||  || — || December 31, 2007 || Mount Lemmon || Mount Lemmon Survey ||  || align=right | 2.0 km || 
|-id=948 bgcolor=#d6d6d6
| 597948 ||  || — || December 30, 2007 || Mount Lemmon || Mount Lemmon Survey ||  || align=right | 2.5 km || 
|-id=949 bgcolor=#E9E9E9
| 597949 ||  || — || December 18, 2007 || Mount Lemmon || Mount Lemmon Survey ||  || align=right | 2.6 km || 
|-id=950 bgcolor=#E9E9E9
| 597950 ||  || — || December 19, 2007 || Mount Lemmon || Mount Lemmon Survey ||  || align=right | 2.2 km || 
|-id=951 bgcolor=#E9E9E9
| 597951 ||  || — || February 14, 2013 || Haleakala || Pan-STARRS ||  || align=right | 2.1 km || 
|-id=952 bgcolor=#d6d6d6
| 597952 ||  || — || November 14, 2012 || Kitt Peak || Spacewatch ||  || align=right | 2.2 km || 
|-id=953 bgcolor=#fefefe
| 597953 ||  || — || December 31, 2007 || Kitt Peak || Spacewatch ||  || align=right data-sort-value="0.50" | 500 m || 
|-id=954 bgcolor=#d6d6d6
| 597954 ||  || — || November 23, 2012 || Kitt Peak || Spacewatch ||  || align=right | 1.7 km || 
|-id=955 bgcolor=#d6d6d6
| 597955 ||  || — || October 15, 2012 || Haleakala || Pan-STARRS ||  || align=right | 1.9 km || 
|-id=956 bgcolor=#E9E9E9
| 597956 ||  || — || December 16, 2007 || Kitt Peak || Spacewatch ||  || align=right | 1.6 km || 
|-id=957 bgcolor=#d6d6d6
| 597957 ||  || — || December 17, 2007 || Mount Lemmon || Mount Lemmon Survey ||  || align=right | 2.1 km || 
|-id=958 bgcolor=#fefefe
| 597958 ||  || — || December 30, 2007 || Mount Lemmon || Mount Lemmon Survey || H || align=right data-sort-value="0.53" | 530 m || 
|-id=959 bgcolor=#E9E9E9
| 597959 ||  || — || December 18, 2007 || Mount Lemmon || Mount Lemmon Survey ||  || align=right | 1.9 km || 
|-id=960 bgcolor=#d6d6d6
| 597960 ||  || — || December 16, 2007 || Mount Lemmon || Mount Lemmon Survey ||  || align=right | 2.5 km || 
|-id=961 bgcolor=#d6d6d6
| 597961 ||  || — || December 19, 2007 || Kitt Peak || Spacewatch ||  || align=right | 2.5 km || 
|-id=962 bgcolor=#fefefe
| 597962 ||  || — || January 1, 2008 || Junk Bond || D. Healy || NYS || align=right data-sort-value="0.64" | 640 m || 
|-id=963 bgcolor=#fefefe
| 597963 ||  || — || November 21, 2003 || Kitt Peak || Spacewatch ||  || align=right data-sort-value="0.56" | 560 m || 
|-id=964 bgcolor=#E9E9E9
| 597964 ||  || — || January 10, 2008 || Marly || P. Kocher ||  || align=right | 2.0 km || 
|-id=965 bgcolor=#E9E9E9
| 597965 ||  || — || January 10, 2008 || Calvin-Rehoboth || A. Vanden Heuvel || GEF || align=right | 1.0 km || 
|-id=966 bgcolor=#fefefe
| 597966 ||  || — || January 12, 2008 || Lulin || LUSS ||  || align=right data-sort-value="0.92" | 920 m || 
|-id=967 bgcolor=#fefefe
| 597967 ||  || — || January 10, 2008 || Lulin || LUSS || H || align=right data-sort-value="0.66" | 660 m || 
|-id=968 bgcolor=#E9E9E9
| 597968 ||  || — || January 3, 2008 || Kitt Peak || Spacewatch ||  || align=right | 1.7 km || 
|-id=969 bgcolor=#fefefe
| 597969 ||  || — || January 12, 2008 || Kitt Peak || Spacewatch || H || align=right data-sort-value="0.48" | 480 m || 
|-id=970 bgcolor=#d6d6d6
| 597970 ||  || — || January 10, 2008 || Mount Lemmon || Mount Lemmon Survey ||  || align=right | 2.0 km || 
|-id=971 bgcolor=#fefefe
| 597971 ||  || — || January 11, 2008 || Kitt Peak || Spacewatch ||  || align=right data-sort-value="0.83" | 830 m || 
|-id=972 bgcolor=#d6d6d6
| 597972 ||  || — || November 19, 2007 || Mount Lemmon || Mount Lemmon Survey ||  || align=right | 2.3 km || 
|-id=973 bgcolor=#fefefe
| 597973 ||  || — || January 12, 2008 || Kitt Peak || Spacewatch ||  || align=right data-sort-value="0.65" | 650 m || 
|-id=974 bgcolor=#d6d6d6
| 597974 ||  || — || August 20, 2006 || Palomar || NEAT ||  || align=right | 3.4 km || 
|-id=975 bgcolor=#E9E9E9
| 597975 ||  || — || January 14, 2008 || Kitt Peak || Spacewatch ||  || align=right | 1.1 km || 
|-id=976 bgcolor=#d6d6d6
| 597976 ||  || — || January 15, 2008 || Kitt Peak || Spacewatch ||  || align=right | 2.5 km || 
|-id=977 bgcolor=#d6d6d6
| 597977 ||  || — || December 16, 2007 || Kitt Peak || Spacewatch ||  || align=right | 1.7 km || 
|-id=978 bgcolor=#fefefe
| 597978 ||  || — || January 15, 2008 || Kitt Peak || Spacewatch ||  || align=right data-sort-value="0.64" | 640 m || 
|-id=979 bgcolor=#d6d6d6
| 597979 ||  || — || January 31, 2008 || Mount Lemmon || Mount Lemmon Survey ||  || align=right | 2.0 km || 
|-id=980 bgcolor=#d6d6d6
| 597980 ||  || — || September 23, 2005 || Kitt Peak || Spacewatch ||  || align=right | 3.6 km || 
|-id=981 bgcolor=#d6d6d6
| 597981 ||  || — || March 11, 2003 || Palomar || NEAT ||  || align=right | 2.8 km || 
|-id=982 bgcolor=#d6d6d6
| 597982 ||  || — || January 13, 2008 || Kitt Peak || Spacewatch ||  || align=right | 2.0 km || 
|-id=983 bgcolor=#d6d6d6
| 597983 ||  || — || January 1, 2008 || Kitt Peak || Spacewatch ||  || align=right | 2.3 km || 
|-id=984 bgcolor=#E9E9E9
| 597984 ||  || — || January 1, 2008 || Kitt Peak || Spacewatch ||  || align=right | 2.4 km || 
|-id=985 bgcolor=#d6d6d6
| 597985 ||  || — || January 11, 2008 || Mount Lemmon || Mount Lemmon Survey ||  || align=right | 2.0 km || 
|-id=986 bgcolor=#d6d6d6
| 597986 ||  || — || April 5, 2014 || Haleakala || Pan-STARRS ||  || align=right | 2.0 km || 
|-id=987 bgcolor=#d6d6d6
| 597987 ||  || — || January 1, 2008 || Kitt Peak || Spacewatch ||  || align=right | 1.7 km || 
|-id=988 bgcolor=#d6d6d6
| 597988 ||  || — || April 21, 2009 || Mount Lemmon || Mount Lemmon Survey ||  || align=right | 1.8 km || 
|-id=989 bgcolor=#d6d6d6
| 597989 ||  || — || January 13, 2008 || Kitt Peak || Spacewatch ||  || align=right | 1.8 km || 
|-id=990 bgcolor=#E9E9E9
| 597990 ||  || — || January 15, 2008 || Mount Lemmon || Mount Lemmon Survey ||  || align=right | 1.9 km || 
|-id=991 bgcolor=#d6d6d6
| 597991 ||  || — || January 11, 2008 || Kitt Peak || Spacewatch ||  || align=right | 2.2 km || 
|-id=992 bgcolor=#fefefe
| 597992 ||  || — || January 16, 2008 || Kitt Peak || Spacewatch ||  || align=right data-sort-value="0.64" | 640 m || 
|-id=993 bgcolor=#E9E9E9
| 597993 Bélesta ||  ||  || January 28, 2008 || Belesta || P. Martinez ||  || align=right | 2.3 km || 
|-id=994 bgcolor=#E9E9E9
| 597994 ||  || — || January 30, 2008 || Mount Lemmon || Mount Lemmon Survey ||  || align=right data-sort-value="0.70" | 700 m || 
|-id=995 bgcolor=#d6d6d6
| 597995 ||  || — || August 4, 2005 || Palomar || NEAT ||  || align=right | 3.8 km || 
|-id=996 bgcolor=#d6d6d6
| 597996 ||  || — || October 23, 2011 || Mount Lemmon || Mount Lemmon Survey ||  || align=right | 1.8 km || 
|-id=997 bgcolor=#fefefe
| 597997 ||  || — || January 18, 2008 || Kitt Peak || Spacewatch ||  || align=right data-sort-value="0.60" | 600 m || 
|-id=998 bgcolor=#d6d6d6
| 597998 ||  || — || January 28, 2000 || Kitt Peak || Spacewatch || 3:2 || align=right | 5.3 km || 
|-id=999 bgcolor=#fefefe
| 597999 ||  || — || March 22, 2012 || Mount Lemmon || Mount Lemmon Survey ||  || align=right data-sort-value="0.66" | 660 m || 
|-id=000 bgcolor=#d6d6d6
| 598000 ||  || — || February 3, 2008 || Kitt Peak || Spacewatch ||  || align=right | 2.0 km || 
|}

References

External links 
 Discovery Circumstances: Numbered Minor Planets (595001)–(600000) (IAU Minor Planet Center)

0597